

377001–377100 

|-bgcolor=#fefefe
| 377001 ||  || — || August 29, 2002 || Palomar || S. F. Hönig || NYS || align=right data-sort-value="0.65" | 650 m || 
|-id=002 bgcolor=#d6d6d6
| 377002 ||  || — || August 28, 2002 || Palomar || NEAT || — || align=right | 2.8 km || 
|-id=003 bgcolor=#d6d6d6
| 377003 ||  || — || August 16, 2002 || Palomar || NEAT || — || align=right | 2.6 km || 
|-id=004 bgcolor=#d6d6d6
| 377004 ||  || — || August 17, 2002 || Palomar || NEAT || — || align=right | 2.2 km || 
|-id=005 bgcolor=#fefefe
| 377005 ||  || — || August 17, 2002 || Palomar || NEAT || MAS || align=right data-sort-value="0.62" | 620 m || 
|-id=006 bgcolor=#fefefe
| 377006 ||  || — || August 29, 2002 || Palomar || NEAT || — || align=right data-sort-value="0.63" | 630 m || 
|-id=007 bgcolor=#fefefe
| 377007 ||  || — || August 19, 2002 || Palomar || NEAT || V || align=right data-sort-value="0.79" | 790 m || 
|-id=008 bgcolor=#fefefe
| 377008 ||  || — || August 27, 2002 || Palomar || NEAT || — || align=right data-sort-value="0.92" | 920 m || 
|-id=009 bgcolor=#d6d6d6
| 377009 ||  || — || August 18, 2002 || Palomar || NEAT || — || align=right | 2.4 km || 
|-id=010 bgcolor=#d6d6d6
| 377010 ||  || — || August 28, 2002 || Palomar || NEAT || — || align=right | 3.2 km || 
|-id=011 bgcolor=#fefefe
| 377011 ||  || — || August 17, 2002 || Palomar || NEAT || — || align=right data-sort-value="0.71" | 710 m || 
|-id=012 bgcolor=#fefefe
| 377012 ||  || — || August 30, 2002 || Palomar || NEAT || FLO || align=right data-sort-value="0.90" | 900 m || 
|-id=013 bgcolor=#d6d6d6
| 377013 ||  || — || September 4, 2002 || Palomar || NEAT || — || align=right | 3.8 km || 
|-id=014 bgcolor=#fefefe
| 377014 ||  || — || September 4, 2002 || Anderson Mesa || LONEOS || — || align=right data-sort-value="0.81" | 810 m || 
|-id=015 bgcolor=#d6d6d6
| 377015 ||  || — || September 4, 2002 || Ondřejov || P. Kušnirák || — || align=right | 2.6 km || 
|-id=016 bgcolor=#d6d6d6
| 377016 ||  || — || September 4, 2002 || Anderson Mesa || LONEOS || — || align=right | 3.0 km || 
|-id=017 bgcolor=#fefefe
| 377017 ||  || — || September 5, 2002 || Socorro || LINEAR || — || align=right data-sort-value="0.83" | 830 m || 
|-id=018 bgcolor=#fefefe
| 377018 ||  || — || September 5, 2002 || Socorro || LINEAR || — || align=right data-sort-value="0.96" | 960 m || 
|-id=019 bgcolor=#d6d6d6
| 377019 ||  || — || August 11, 2002 || Socorro || LINEAR || — || align=right | 4.5 km || 
|-id=020 bgcolor=#d6d6d6
| 377020 ||  || — || September 5, 2002 || Anderson Mesa || LONEOS || — || align=right | 3.2 km || 
|-id=021 bgcolor=#FA8072
| 377021 ||  || — || September 5, 2002 || Socorro || LINEAR || — || align=right | 2.0 km || 
|-id=022 bgcolor=#d6d6d6
| 377022 ||  || — || September 11, 2002 || Palomar || NEAT || — || align=right | 3.0 km || 
|-id=023 bgcolor=#fefefe
| 377023 ||  || — || September 9, 2002 || Haleakala || NEAT || NYS || align=right data-sort-value="0.70" | 700 m || 
|-id=024 bgcolor=#fefefe
| 377024 ||  || — || September 10, 2002 || Palomar || NEAT || — || align=right | 1.0 km || 
|-id=025 bgcolor=#d6d6d6
| 377025 ||  || — || September 14, 2002 || Palomar || NEAT || — || align=right | 3.1 km || 
|-id=026 bgcolor=#fefefe
| 377026 ||  || — || September 14, 2002 || Kitt Peak || Spacewatch || NYS || align=right data-sort-value="0.62" | 620 m || 
|-id=027 bgcolor=#d6d6d6
| 377027 ||  || — || September 15, 2002 || Palomar || R. Matson || TEL || align=right | 1.5 km || 
|-id=028 bgcolor=#fefefe
| 377028 ||  || — || September 14, 2002 || Palomar || R. Matson || — || align=right data-sort-value="0.83" | 830 m || 
|-id=029 bgcolor=#d6d6d6
| 377029 ||  || — || September 14, 2002 || Palomar || R. Matson || — || align=right | 3.8 km || 
|-id=030 bgcolor=#d6d6d6
| 377030 ||  || — || September 12, 2002 || Palomar || NEAT || — || align=right | 3.6 km || 
|-id=031 bgcolor=#d6d6d6
| 377031 ||  || — || September 4, 2002 || Palomar || NEAT || — || align=right | 2.2 km || 
|-id=032 bgcolor=#d6d6d6
| 377032 ||  || — || September 4, 2002 || Palomar || NEAT || — || align=right | 4.3 km || 
|-id=033 bgcolor=#d6d6d6
| 377033 ||  || — || September 12, 2002 || Palomar || NEAT || EOS || align=right | 2.1 km || 
|-id=034 bgcolor=#d6d6d6
| 377034 ||  || — || September 27, 2002 || Palomar || NEAT || — || align=right | 5.6 km || 
|-id=035 bgcolor=#d6d6d6
| 377035 ||  || — || September 27, 2002 || Palomar || NEAT || — || align=right | 3.9 km || 
|-id=036 bgcolor=#fefefe
| 377036 ||  || — || September 29, 2002 || Haleakala || NEAT || H || align=right data-sort-value="0.98" | 980 m || 
|-id=037 bgcolor=#fefefe
| 377037 ||  || — || September 29, 2002 || Haleakala || NEAT || NYS || align=right data-sort-value="0.66" | 660 m || 
|-id=038 bgcolor=#d6d6d6
| 377038 ||  || — || September 30, 2002 || Socorro || LINEAR || — || align=right | 3.1 km || 
|-id=039 bgcolor=#fefefe
| 377039 ||  || — || September 27, 2002 || Palomar || NEAT || H || align=right data-sort-value="0.63" | 630 m || 
|-id=040 bgcolor=#d6d6d6
| 377040 ||  || — || September 16, 2002 || Palomar || NEAT || EOS || align=right | 2.3 km || 
|-id=041 bgcolor=#fefefe
| 377041 ||  || — || October 1, 2002 || Anderson Mesa || LONEOS || — || align=right data-sort-value="0.97" | 970 m || 
|-id=042 bgcolor=#fefefe
| 377042 ||  || — || October 1, 2002 || Anderson Mesa || LONEOS || — || align=right data-sort-value="0.74" | 740 m || 
|-id=043 bgcolor=#fefefe
| 377043 ||  || — || October 2, 2002 || Socorro || LINEAR || NYS || align=right data-sort-value="0.68" | 680 m || 
|-id=044 bgcolor=#fefefe
| 377044 ||  || — || October 2, 2002 || Haleakala || NEAT || NYS || align=right data-sort-value="0.65" | 650 m || 
|-id=045 bgcolor=#fefefe
| 377045 ||  || — || October 2, 2002 || Socorro || LINEAR || H || align=right data-sort-value="0.75" | 750 m || 
|-id=046 bgcolor=#d6d6d6
| 377046 ||  || — || October 2, 2002 || Socorro || LINEAR || THB || align=right | 3.6 km || 
|-id=047 bgcolor=#d6d6d6
| 377047 ||  || — || October 2, 2002 || Socorro || LINEAR || — || align=right | 3.4 km || 
|-id=048 bgcolor=#d6d6d6
| 377048 ||  || — || October 3, 2002 || Palomar || NEAT || — || align=right | 3.4 km || 
|-id=049 bgcolor=#d6d6d6
| 377049 ||  || — || October 3, 2002 || Palomar || NEAT || — || align=right | 3.7 km || 
|-id=050 bgcolor=#d6d6d6
| 377050 ||  || — || October 3, 2002 || Palomar || NEAT || — || align=right | 3.2 km || 
|-id=051 bgcolor=#d6d6d6
| 377051 ||  || — || October 4, 2002 || Palomar || NEAT || — || align=right | 3.6 km || 
|-id=052 bgcolor=#FA8072
| 377052 ||  || — || September 15, 2002 || Anderson Mesa || LONEOS || — || align=right | 2.0 km || 
|-id=053 bgcolor=#d6d6d6
| 377053 ||  || — || October 3, 2002 || Palomar || NEAT || — || align=right | 4.8 km || 
|-id=054 bgcolor=#d6d6d6
| 377054 ||  || — || October 1, 2002 || Socorro || LINEAR || — || align=right | 3.3 km || 
|-id=055 bgcolor=#d6d6d6
| 377055 ||  || — || October 9, 2002 || Socorro || LINEAR || — || align=right | 3.5 km || 
|-id=056 bgcolor=#d6d6d6
| 377056 ||  || — || October 4, 2002 || Campo Imperatore || CINEOS || — || align=right | 3.7 km || 
|-id=057 bgcolor=#d6d6d6
| 377057 ||  || — || October 10, 2002 || Socorro || LINEAR || — || align=right | 4.1 km || 
|-id=058 bgcolor=#fefefe
| 377058 ||  || — || October 3, 2002 || Socorro || LINEAR || — || align=right data-sort-value="0.75" | 750 m || 
|-id=059 bgcolor=#d6d6d6
| 377059 ||  || — || October 4, 2002 || Socorro || LINEAR || THB || align=right | 3.9 km || 
|-id=060 bgcolor=#d6d6d6
| 377060 ||  || — || October 12, 2002 || Socorro || LINEAR || — || align=right | 2.8 km || 
|-id=061 bgcolor=#fefefe
| 377061 ||  || — || October 13, 2002 || Palomar || NEAT || H || align=right data-sort-value="0.71" | 710 m || 
|-id=062 bgcolor=#fefefe
| 377062 ||  || — || October 2, 2002 || Socorro || LINEAR || — || align=right data-sort-value="0.74" | 740 m || 
|-id=063 bgcolor=#fefefe
| 377063 ||  || — || October 4, 2002 || Apache Point || SDSS || — || align=right data-sort-value="0.83" | 830 m || 
|-id=064 bgcolor=#d6d6d6
| 377064 ||  || — || October 5, 2002 || Apache Point || SDSS || EOS || align=right | 2.1 km || 
|-id=065 bgcolor=#fefefe
| 377065 ||  || — || October 5, 2002 || Apache Point || SDSS || FLO || align=right data-sort-value="0.57" | 570 m || 
|-id=066 bgcolor=#d6d6d6
| 377066 ||  || — || October 5, 2002 || Apache Point || SDSS || EUP || align=right | 3.4 km || 
|-id=067 bgcolor=#d6d6d6
| 377067 ||  || — || October 5, 2002 || Apache Point || SDSS || — || align=right | 2.6 km || 
|-id=068 bgcolor=#d6d6d6
| 377068 ||  || — || October 5, 2002 || Apache Point || SDSS || — || align=right | 3.6 km || 
|-id=069 bgcolor=#d6d6d6
| 377069 ||  || — || October 5, 2002 || Apache Point || SDSS || — || align=right | 3.0 km || 
|-id=070 bgcolor=#d6d6d6
| 377070 ||  || — || October 10, 2002 || Apache Point || SDSS || — || align=right | 4.1 km || 
|-id=071 bgcolor=#d6d6d6
| 377071 ||  || — || October 4, 2002 || Palomar || NEAT || — || align=right | 3.0 km || 
|-id=072 bgcolor=#d6d6d6
| 377072 ||  || — || October 4, 2002 || Palomar || NEAT || — || align=right | 3.7 km || 
|-id=073 bgcolor=#fefefe
| 377073 ||  || — || October 10, 2002 || Apache Point || SDSS || — || align=right data-sort-value="0.81" | 810 m || 
|-id=074 bgcolor=#fefefe
| 377074 ||  || — || October 28, 2002 || Palomar || NEAT || — || align=right | 1.0 km || 
|-id=075 bgcolor=#d6d6d6
| 377075 ||  || — || October 29, 2002 || Palomar || NEAT || TIR || align=right | 4.1 km || 
|-id=076 bgcolor=#d6d6d6
| 377076 ||  || — || October 30, 2002 || Kitt Peak || Spacewatch || — || align=right | 3.3 km || 
|-id=077 bgcolor=#d6d6d6
| 377077 ||  || — || October 31, 2002 || La Palma || La Palma Obs. || HYG || align=right | 2.7 km || 
|-id=078 bgcolor=#d6d6d6
| 377078 ||  || — || October 29, 2002 || Apache Point || SDSS || EOS || align=right | 2.2 km || 
|-id=079 bgcolor=#d6d6d6
| 377079 ||  || — || October 29, 2002 || Palomar || NEAT || LIX || align=right | 4.1 km || 
|-id=080 bgcolor=#d6d6d6
| 377080 ||  || — || October 31, 2002 || Palomar || NEAT || — || align=right | 3.8 km || 
|-id=081 bgcolor=#d6d6d6
| 377081 ||  || — || November 3, 2002 || Wrightwood || J. W. Young || — || align=right | 2.8 km || 
|-id=082 bgcolor=#d6d6d6
| 377082 ||  || — || November 2, 2002 || La Palma || La Palma Obs. || — || align=right | 2.4 km || 
|-id=083 bgcolor=#fefefe
| 377083 ||  || — || November 1, 2002 || Haleakala || NEAT || NYS || align=right data-sort-value="0.90" | 900 m || 
|-id=084 bgcolor=#fefefe
| 377084 ||  || — || November 7, 2002 || Socorro || LINEAR || — || align=right | 1.2 km || 
|-id=085 bgcolor=#d6d6d6
| 377085 ||  || — || November 7, 2002 || Socorro || LINEAR || MEL || align=right | 4.2 km || 
|-id=086 bgcolor=#d6d6d6
| 377086 ||  || — || November 11, 2002 || Socorro || LINEAR || EUP || align=right | 5.2 km || 
|-id=087 bgcolor=#fefefe
| 377087 ||  || — || November 12, 2002 || Socorro || LINEAR || — || align=right | 1.9 km || 
|-id=088 bgcolor=#fefefe
| 377088 ||  || — || November 5, 2002 || Palomar || NEAT || NYS || align=right data-sort-value="0.84" | 840 m || 
|-id=089 bgcolor=#fefefe
| 377089 ||  || — || November 12, 2002 || Palomar || NEAT || MAS || align=right data-sort-value="0.65" | 650 m || 
|-id=090 bgcolor=#fefefe
| 377090 ||  || — || November 4, 2002 || Palomar || NEAT || MAS || align=right data-sort-value="0.82" | 820 m || 
|-id=091 bgcolor=#d6d6d6
| 377091 ||  || — || November 4, 2002 || Palomar || NEAT || — || align=right | 3.8 km || 
|-id=092 bgcolor=#d6d6d6
| 377092 ||  || — || November 5, 2002 || Palomar || NEAT || — || align=right | 3.9 km || 
|-id=093 bgcolor=#d6d6d6
| 377093 ||  || — || November 4, 2002 || Palomar || NEAT || — || align=right | 2.5 km || 
|-id=094 bgcolor=#C2FFFF
| 377094 ||  || — || November 23, 2002 || Palomar || NEAT || L5 || align=right | 12 km || 
|-id=095 bgcolor=#d6d6d6
| 377095 ||  || — || November 23, 2002 || Palomar || NEAT || — || align=right | 4.2 km || 
|-id=096 bgcolor=#d6d6d6
| 377096 ||  || — || November 23, 2002 || Palomar || NEAT || URS || align=right | 4.7 km || 
|-id=097 bgcolor=#FFC2E0
| 377097 ||  || — || November 24, 2002 || Palomar || NEAT || APOPHAcritical || align=right data-sort-value="0.45" | 450 m || 
|-id=098 bgcolor=#fefefe
| 377098 ||  || — || November 24, 2002 || Palomar || NEAT || — || align=right | 1.1 km || 
|-id=099 bgcolor=#d6d6d6
| 377099 ||  || — || November 24, 2002 || Palomar || NEAT || — || align=right | 3.3 km || 
|-id=100 bgcolor=#d6d6d6
| 377100 ||  || — || November 28, 2002 || Anderson Mesa || LONEOS || — || align=right | 4.0 km || 
|}

377101–377200 

|-bgcolor=#d6d6d6
| 377101 ||  || — || November 24, 2002 || Palomar || S. F. Hönig || EOS || align=right | 2.5 km || 
|-id=102 bgcolor=#fefefe
| 377102 ||  || — || November 16, 2002 || Palomar || NEAT || NYS || align=right data-sort-value="0.59" | 590 m || 
|-id=103 bgcolor=#d6d6d6
| 377103 ||  || — || November 25, 2002 || Palomar || NEAT || THM || align=right | 2.3 km || 
|-id=104 bgcolor=#fefefe
| 377104 ||  || — || November 25, 2002 || Palomar || NEAT || MAS || align=right data-sort-value="0.70" | 700 m || 
|-id=105 bgcolor=#d6d6d6
| 377105 ||  || — || November 16, 2002 || Palomar || NEAT || — || align=right | 3.2 km || 
|-id=106 bgcolor=#d6d6d6
| 377106 ||  || — || November 16, 2002 || Palomar || NEAT || — || align=right | 4.4 km || 
|-id=107 bgcolor=#d6d6d6
| 377107 ||  || — || November 16, 2002 || Palomar || NEAT || — || align=right | 2.9 km || 
|-id=108 bgcolor=#d6d6d6
| 377108 ||  || — || November 23, 2002 || Palomar || NEAT || EUP || align=right | 3.9 km || 
|-id=109 bgcolor=#d6d6d6
| 377109 ||  || — || November 22, 2002 || Palomar || NEAT || — || align=right | 3.9 km || 
|-id=110 bgcolor=#C2FFFF
| 377110 ||  || — || November 23, 2002 || Palomar || NEAT || L5 || align=right | 9.9 km || 
|-id=111 bgcolor=#d6d6d6
| 377111 ||  || — || December 1, 2002 || Socorro || LINEAR || — || align=right | 4.0 km || 
|-id=112 bgcolor=#d6d6d6
| 377112 ||  || — || December 2, 2002 || Socorro || LINEAR || — || align=right | 4.2 km || 
|-id=113 bgcolor=#d6d6d6
| 377113 ||  || — || December 5, 2002 || Socorro || LINEAR || — || align=right | 3.8 km || 
|-id=114 bgcolor=#FA8072
| 377114 ||  || — || December 5, 2002 || Palomar || NEAT || PHO || align=right | 1.8 km || 
|-id=115 bgcolor=#fefefe
| 377115 ||  || — || December 6, 2002 || Socorro || LINEAR || — || align=right | 1.1 km || 
|-id=116 bgcolor=#d6d6d6
| 377116 ||  || — || December 10, 2002 || Socorro || LINEAR || EUP || align=right | 5.9 km || 
|-id=117 bgcolor=#fefefe
| 377117 ||  || — || December 11, 2002 || Palomar || NEAT || H || align=right | 1.1 km || 
|-id=118 bgcolor=#d6d6d6
| 377118 ||  || — || December 3, 2002 || Palomar || NEAT || — || align=right | 3.2 km || 
|-id=119 bgcolor=#d6d6d6
| 377119 ||  || — || December 31, 2002 || Socorro || LINEAR || — || align=right | 4.0 km || 
|-id=120 bgcolor=#d6d6d6
| 377120 ||  || — || January 1, 2003 || Socorro || LINEAR || — || align=right | 4.8 km || 
|-id=121 bgcolor=#d6d6d6
| 377121 ||  || — || January 4, 2003 || Socorro || LINEAR || — || align=right | 3.3 km || 
|-id=122 bgcolor=#d6d6d6
| 377122 ||  || — || January 12, 2003 || Socorro || LINEAR || Tj (2.95) || align=right | 4.7 km || 
|-id=123 bgcolor=#fefefe
| 377123 ||  || — || January 26, 2003 || Anderson Mesa || LONEOS || — || align=right | 1.2 km || 
|-id=124 bgcolor=#d6d6d6
| 377124 ||  || — || January 26, 2003 || Haleakala || NEAT || — || align=right | 3.7 km || 
|-id=125 bgcolor=#fefefe
| 377125 ||  || — || January 27, 2003 || Haleakala || NEAT || — || align=right | 1.2 km || 
|-id=126 bgcolor=#fefefe
| 377126 ||  || — || January 30, 2003 || Anderson Mesa || LONEOS || — || align=right | 1.0 km || 
|-id=127 bgcolor=#FA8072
| 377127 ||  || — || March 8, 2003 || Socorro || LINEAR || — || align=right | 1.0 km || 
|-id=128 bgcolor=#E9E9E9
| 377128 ||  || — || March 29, 2003 || Anderson Mesa || LONEOS || JUN || align=right | 1.6 km || 
|-id=129 bgcolor=#E9E9E9
| 377129 ||  || — || April 8, 2003 || Palomar || NEAT || — || align=right | 3.7 km || 
|-id=130 bgcolor=#E9E9E9
| 377130 ||  || — || April 8, 2003 || Kvistaberg || UDAS || — || align=right | 2.5 km || 
|-id=131 bgcolor=#E9E9E9
| 377131 ||  || — || April 7, 2003 || Kitt Peak || Spacewatch || — || align=right | 2.0 km || 
|-id=132 bgcolor=#E9E9E9
| 377132 ||  || — || April 7, 2003 || Kitt Peak || Spacewatch || JUN || align=right | 1.2 km || 
|-id=133 bgcolor=#E9E9E9
| 377133 ||  || — || April 25, 2003 || Kitt Peak || Spacewatch || — || align=right data-sort-value="0.89" | 890 m || 
|-id=134 bgcolor=#FA8072
| 377134 ||  || — || May 8, 2003 || Socorro || LINEAR || — || align=right | 1.2 km || 
|-id=135 bgcolor=#E9E9E9
| 377135 ||  || — || May 22, 2003 || Reedy Creek || J. Broughton || — || align=right | 1.4 km || 
|-id=136 bgcolor=#E9E9E9
| 377136 ||  || — || April 28, 2003 || Kitt Peak || Spacewatch || — || align=right | 1.8 km || 
|-id=137 bgcolor=#E9E9E9
| 377137 ||  || — || June 26, 2003 || Socorro || LINEAR || INO || align=right | 2.1 km || 
|-id=138 bgcolor=#E9E9E9
| 377138 ||  || — || July 1, 2003 || Socorro || LINEAR || DOR || align=right | 3.4 km || 
|-id=139 bgcolor=#E9E9E9
| 377139 ||  || — || July 8, 2003 || Palomar || NEAT || — || align=right | 3.7 km || 
|-id=140 bgcolor=#E9E9E9
| 377140 ||  || — || July 23, 2003 || Palomar || NEAT || DOR || align=right | 4.3 km || 
|-id=141 bgcolor=#fefefe
| 377141 ||  || — || July 30, 2003 || Needville || W. G. Dillon, P. Garossino || — || align=right data-sort-value="0.57" | 570 m || 
|-id=142 bgcolor=#fefefe
| 377142 ||  || — || August 20, 2003 || Socorro || LINEAR || — || align=right | 1.4 km || 
|-id=143 bgcolor=#fefefe
| 377143 ||  || — || August 22, 2003 || Palomar || NEAT || NYS || align=right data-sort-value="0.63" | 630 m || 
|-id=144 bgcolor=#E9E9E9
| 377144 Okietex ||  ||  || August 30, 2003 || Needville || J. Dellinger, D. Wells || — || align=right | 3.4 km || 
|-id=145 bgcolor=#FA8072
| 377145 ||  || — || August 31, 2003 || Haleakala || NEAT || — || align=right | 1.1 km || 
|-id=146 bgcolor=#fefefe
| 377146 ||  || — || August 26, 2003 || Socorro || LINEAR || — || align=right data-sort-value="0.74" | 740 m || 
|-id=147 bgcolor=#E9E9E9
| 377147 ||  || — || September 15, 2003 || Anderson Mesa || LONEOS || — || align=right | 3.4 km || 
|-id=148 bgcolor=#fefefe
| 377148 ||  || — || September 16, 2003 || Kitt Peak || Spacewatch || — || align=right data-sort-value="0.85" | 850 m || 
|-id=149 bgcolor=#E9E9E9
| 377149 ||  || — || September 18, 2003 || Palomar || NEAT || — || align=right | 3.1 km || 
|-id=150 bgcolor=#fefefe
| 377150 ||  || — || September 18, 2003 || Palomar || NEAT || — || align=right data-sort-value="0.75" | 750 m || 
|-id=151 bgcolor=#fefefe
| 377151 ||  || — || September 17, 2003 || Kitt Peak || Spacewatch || — || align=right data-sort-value="0.59" | 590 m || 
|-id=152 bgcolor=#fefefe
| 377152 ||  || — || September 16, 2003 || Anderson Mesa || LONEOS || — || align=right data-sort-value="0.73" | 730 m || 
|-id=153 bgcolor=#d6d6d6
| 377153 ||  || — || September 21, 2003 || Campo Imperatore || CINEOS || — || align=right | 3.1 km || 
|-id=154 bgcolor=#fefefe
| 377154 ||  || — || September 19, 2003 || Anderson Mesa || LONEOS || — || align=right data-sort-value="0.72" | 720 m || 
|-id=155 bgcolor=#fefefe
| 377155 ||  || — || September 20, 2003 || Palomar || NEAT || H || align=right data-sort-value="0.55" | 550 m || 
|-id=156 bgcolor=#d6d6d6
| 377156 ||  || — || September 21, 2003 || Anderson Mesa || LONEOS || — || align=right | 2.3 km || 
|-id=157 bgcolor=#E9E9E9
| 377157 ||  || — || September 16, 2003 || Kitt Peak || Spacewatch || AGN || align=right | 1.3 km || 
|-id=158 bgcolor=#fefefe
| 377158 ||  || — || September 18, 2003 || Kitt Peak || Spacewatch || — || align=right data-sort-value="0.72" | 720 m || 
|-id=159 bgcolor=#d6d6d6
| 377159 ||  || — || September 18, 2003 || Kitt Peak || Spacewatch || K-2 || align=right | 1.3 km || 
|-id=160 bgcolor=#d6d6d6
| 377160 ||  || — || September 18, 2003 || Kitt Peak || Spacewatch || KOR || align=right | 1.4 km || 
|-id=161 bgcolor=#E9E9E9
| 377161 ||  || — || September 20, 2003 || Kitt Peak || Spacewatch || — || align=right | 2.3 km || 
|-id=162 bgcolor=#d6d6d6
| 377162 ||  || — || September 26, 2003 || Apache Point || SDSS || FIR || align=right | 4.2 km || 
|-id=163 bgcolor=#d6d6d6
| 377163 ||  || — || September 26, 2003 || Apache Point || SDSS || — || align=right | 1.9 km || 
|-id=164 bgcolor=#d6d6d6
| 377164 ||  || — || September 26, 2003 || Apache Point || SDSS || — || align=right | 2.3 km || 
|-id=165 bgcolor=#d6d6d6
| 377165 ||  || — || September 26, 2003 || Apache Point || SDSS || — || align=right | 2.4 km || 
|-id=166 bgcolor=#fefefe
| 377166 ||  || — || September 18, 2003 || Kitt Peak || Spacewatch || — || align=right data-sort-value="0.66" | 660 m || 
|-id=167 bgcolor=#d6d6d6
| 377167 ||  || — || September 26, 2003 || Apache Point || SDSS || KOR || align=right | 1.2 km || 
|-id=168 bgcolor=#fefefe
| 377168 ||  || — || October 1, 2003 || Kitt Peak || Spacewatch || — || align=right data-sort-value="0.90" | 900 m || 
|-id=169 bgcolor=#d6d6d6
| 377169 ||  || — || October 1, 2003 || Kitt Peak || Spacewatch || — || align=right | 3.1 km || 
|-id=170 bgcolor=#d6d6d6
| 377170 ||  || — || October 2, 2003 || Kitt Peak || Spacewatch || — || align=right | 5.1 km || 
|-id=171 bgcolor=#d6d6d6
| 377171 ||  || — || October 2, 2003 || Kitt Peak || Spacewatch || CHA || align=right | 2.0 km || 
|-id=172 bgcolor=#FA8072
| 377172 ||  || — || September 21, 2003 || Anderson Mesa || LONEOS || — || align=right data-sort-value="0.91" | 910 m || 
|-id=173 bgcolor=#FA8072
| 377173 ||  || — || October 17, 2003 || Socorro || LINEAR || fast? || align=right data-sort-value="0.85" | 850 m || 
|-id=174 bgcolor=#d6d6d6
| 377174 ||  || — || October 24, 2003 || Kleť || Kleť Obs. || — || align=right | 3.1 km || 
|-id=175 bgcolor=#fefefe
| 377175 ||  || — || September 28, 2003 || Anderson Mesa || LONEOS || FLO || align=right data-sort-value="0.65" | 650 m || 
|-id=176 bgcolor=#d6d6d6
| 377176 ||  || — || October 19, 2003 || Palomar || NEAT || — || align=right | 3.7 km || 
|-id=177 bgcolor=#fefefe
| 377177 ||  || — || October 20, 2003 || Socorro || LINEAR || FLO || align=right data-sort-value="0.67" | 670 m || 
|-id=178 bgcolor=#d6d6d6
| 377178 ||  || — || October 20, 2003 || Kitt Peak || Spacewatch || CHA || align=right | 1.6 km || 
|-id=179 bgcolor=#d6d6d6
| 377179 ||  || — || October 21, 2003 || Palomar || NEAT || — || align=right | 3.3 km || 
|-id=180 bgcolor=#fefefe
| 377180 ||  || — || October 21, 2003 || Socorro || LINEAR || — || align=right data-sort-value="0.68" | 680 m || 
|-id=181 bgcolor=#fefefe
| 377181 ||  || — || October 2, 2003 || Kitt Peak || Spacewatch || — || align=right data-sort-value="0.74" | 740 m || 
|-id=182 bgcolor=#fefefe
| 377182 ||  || — || September 22, 2003 || Kitt Peak || Spacewatch || — || align=right data-sort-value="0.75" | 750 m || 
|-id=183 bgcolor=#fefefe
| 377183 ||  || — || October 24, 2003 || Socorro || LINEAR || — || align=right data-sort-value="0.87" | 870 m || 
|-id=184 bgcolor=#fefefe
| 377184 ||  || — || October 24, 2003 || Socorro || LINEAR || — || align=right data-sort-value="0.83" | 830 m || 
|-id=185 bgcolor=#d6d6d6
| 377185 ||  || — || October 24, 2003 || Socorro || LINEAR || FIR || align=right | 4.4 km || 
|-id=186 bgcolor=#fefefe
| 377186 ||  || — || October 25, 2003 || Socorro || LINEAR || — || align=right data-sort-value="0.93" | 930 m || 
|-id=187 bgcolor=#d6d6d6
| 377187 ||  || — || October 25, 2003 || Kitt Peak || Spacewatch || KOR || align=right | 1.3 km || 
|-id=188 bgcolor=#d6d6d6
| 377188 ||  || — || October 18, 2003 || Apache Point || SDSS || CHA || align=right | 1.7 km || 
|-id=189 bgcolor=#d6d6d6
| 377189 ||  || — || October 19, 2003 || Kitt Peak || Spacewatch || — || align=right | 2.4 km || 
|-id=190 bgcolor=#d6d6d6
| 377190 ||  || — || October 19, 2003 || Apache Point || SDSS || — || align=right | 2.0 km || 
|-id=191 bgcolor=#d6d6d6
| 377191 ||  || — || October 19, 2003 || Apache Point || SDSS || — || align=right | 1.9 km || 
|-id=192 bgcolor=#fefefe
| 377192 ||  || — || November 15, 2003 || Kitt Peak || Spacewatch || — || align=right data-sort-value="0.96" | 960 m || 
|-id=193 bgcolor=#d6d6d6
| 377193 ||  || — || November 18, 2003 || Kitt Peak || Spacewatch || EOS || align=right | 2.2 km || 
|-id=194 bgcolor=#FA8072
| 377194 ||  || — || November 18, 2003 || Kitt Peak || Spacewatch || H || align=right data-sort-value="0.62" | 620 m || 
|-id=195 bgcolor=#d6d6d6
| 377195 ||  || — || October 25, 2003 || Socorro || LINEAR || EOS || align=right | 2.2 km || 
|-id=196 bgcolor=#fefefe
| 377196 ||  || — || November 19, 2003 || Socorro || LINEAR || — || align=right data-sort-value="0.89" | 890 m || 
|-id=197 bgcolor=#fefefe
| 377197 ||  || — || November 19, 2003 || Kitt Peak || Spacewatch || — || align=right data-sort-value="0.71" | 710 m || 
|-id=198 bgcolor=#d6d6d6
| 377198 ||  || — || November 20, 2003 || Socorro || LINEAR || FIR || align=right | 5.4 km || 
|-id=199 bgcolor=#d6d6d6
| 377199 ||  || — || November 19, 2003 || Socorro || LINEAR || — || align=right | 2.7 km || 
|-id=200 bgcolor=#d6d6d6
| 377200 ||  || — || November 20, 2003 || Socorro || LINEAR || — || align=right | 3.3 km || 
|}

377201–377300 

|-bgcolor=#fefefe
| 377201 ||  || — || November 20, 2003 || Socorro || LINEAR || — || align=right data-sort-value="0.89" | 890 m || 
|-id=202 bgcolor=#d6d6d6
| 377202 ||  || — || November 20, 2003 || Kitt Peak || Spacewatch || 628 || align=right | 1.8 km || 
|-id=203 bgcolor=#fefefe
| 377203 ||  || — || November 20, 2003 || Socorro || LINEAR || — || align=right data-sort-value="0.74" | 740 m || 
|-id=204 bgcolor=#FA8072
| 377204 ||  || — || November 2, 2003 || Socorro || LINEAR || — || align=right | 2.7 km || 
|-id=205 bgcolor=#fefefe
| 377205 ||  || — || November 21, 2003 || Socorro || LINEAR || — || align=right data-sort-value="0.70" | 700 m || 
|-id=206 bgcolor=#d6d6d6
| 377206 ||  || — || November 21, 2003 || Socorro || LINEAR || — || align=right | 4.5 km || 
|-id=207 bgcolor=#fefefe
| 377207 ||  || — || November 30, 2003 || Socorro || LINEAR || — || align=right data-sort-value="0.82" | 820 m || 
|-id=208 bgcolor=#d6d6d6
| 377208 ||  || — || November 19, 2003 || Kitt Peak || Spacewatch || — || align=right | 2.6 km || 
|-id=209 bgcolor=#fefefe
| 377209 ||  || — || November 19, 2003 || Kitt Peak || Spacewatch || FLO || align=right data-sort-value="0.62" | 620 m || 
|-id=210 bgcolor=#d6d6d6
| 377210 ||  || — || December 5, 2003 || Socorro || LINEAR || — || align=right | 4.6 km || 
|-id=211 bgcolor=#fefefe
| 377211 ||  || — || December 13, 2003 || Socorro || LINEAR || H || align=right data-sort-value="0.83" | 830 m || 
|-id=212 bgcolor=#fefefe
| 377212 ||  || — || December 15, 2003 || Socorro || LINEAR || H || align=right data-sort-value="0.88" | 880 m || 
|-id=213 bgcolor=#fefefe
| 377213 ||  || — || December 1, 2003 || Socorro || LINEAR || — || align=right data-sort-value="0.89" | 890 m || 
|-id=214 bgcolor=#fefefe
| 377214 ||  || — || December 1, 2003 || Socorro || LINEAR || — || align=right data-sort-value="0.71" | 710 m || 
|-id=215 bgcolor=#d6d6d6
| 377215 ||  || — || December 4, 2003 || Socorro || LINEAR || — || align=right | 3.9 km || 
|-id=216 bgcolor=#d6d6d6
| 377216 ||  || — || December 17, 2003 || Socorro || LINEAR || — || align=right | 2.8 km || 
|-id=217 bgcolor=#d6d6d6
| 377217 ||  || — || December 17, 2003 || Anderson Mesa || LONEOS || — || align=right | 6.7 km || 
|-id=218 bgcolor=#d6d6d6
| 377218 ||  || — || December 17, 2003 || Kitt Peak || Spacewatch || — || align=right | 3.1 km || 
|-id=219 bgcolor=#fefefe
| 377219 ||  || — || December 17, 2003 || Kitt Peak || Spacewatch || MAS || align=right data-sort-value="0.68" | 680 m || 
|-id=220 bgcolor=#d6d6d6
| 377220 ||  || — || December 21, 2003 || Kitt Peak || Spacewatch || EOS || align=right | 2.7 km || 
|-id=221 bgcolor=#d6d6d6
| 377221 ||  || — || December 23, 2003 || Socorro || LINEAR || — || align=right | 3.0 km || 
|-id=222 bgcolor=#C2FFFF
| 377222 ||  || — || December 18, 2003 || Kitt Peak || Spacewatch || L5 || align=right | 13 km || 
|-id=223 bgcolor=#d6d6d6
| 377223 ||  || — || December 27, 2003 || Socorro || LINEAR || TIR || align=right | 3.5 km || 
|-id=224 bgcolor=#C2FFFF
| 377224 ||  || — || December 28, 2003 || Socorro || LINEAR || L5 || align=right | 14 km || 
|-id=225 bgcolor=#d6d6d6
| 377225 ||  || — || December 28, 2003 || Socorro || LINEAR || — || align=right | 3.3 km || 
|-id=226 bgcolor=#d6d6d6
| 377226 ||  || — || December 29, 2003 || Socorro || LINEAR || — || align=right | 4.4 km || 
|-id=227 bgcolor=#d6d6d6
| 377227 ||  || — || December 17, 2003 || Kitt Peak || Spacewatch || — || align=right | 2.4 km || 
|-id=228 bgcolor=#fefefe
| 377228 ||  || — || December 19, 2003 || Kitt Peak || Spacewatch || — || align=right data-sort-value="0.89" | 890 m || 
|-id=229 bgcolor=#fefefe
| 377229 ||  || — || January 15, 2004 || Kitt Peak || Spacewatch || V || align=right data-sort-value="0.77" | 770 m || 
|-id=230 bgcolor=#d6d6d6
| 377230 ||  || — || January 13, 2004 || Anderson Mesa || LONEOS || — || align=right | 3.6 km || 
|-id=231 bgcolor=#fefefe
| 377231 ||  || — || December 23, 2003 || Socorro || LINEAR || H || align=right data-sort-value="0.53" | 530 m || 
|-id=232 bgcolor=#fefefe
| 377232 ||  || — || January 17, 2004 || Palomar || NEAT || PHO || align=right | 1.3 km || 
|-id=233 bgcolor=#fefefe
| 377233 ||  || — || January 17, 2004 || Palomar || NEAT || NYS || align=right data-sort-value="0.67" | 670 m || 
|-id=234 bgcolor=#fefefe
| 377234 ||  || — || January 19, 2004 || Kitt Peak || Spacewatch || — || align=right data-sort-value="0.72" | 720 m || 
|-id=235 bgcolor=#d6d6d6
| 377235 ||  || — || January 19, 2004 || Kitt Peak || Spacewatch || — || align=right | 3.5 km || 
|-id=236 bgcolor=#d6d6d6
| 377236 ||  || — || January 19, 2004 || Kitt Peak || Spacewatch || EOS || align=right | 2.3 km || 
|-id=237 bgcolor=#fefefe
| 377237 ||  || — || January 21, 2004 || Socorro || LINEAR || — || align=right data-sort-value="0.77" | 770 m || 
|-id=238 bgcolor=#d6d6d6
| 377238 ||  || — || January 21, 2004 || Socorro || LINEAR || — || align=right | 3.3 km || 
|-id=239 bgcolor=#d6d6d6
| 377239 ||  || — || January 21, 2004 || Socorro || LINEAR || VER || align=right | 3.6 km || 
|-id=240 bgcolor=#d6d6d6
| 377240 ||  || — || January 22, 2004 || Socorro || LINEAR || — || align=right | 2.9 km || 
|-id=241 bgcolor=#fefefe
| 377241 ||  || — || January 27, 2004 || Socorro || LINEAR || PHO || align=right | 1.6 km || 
|-id=242 bgcolor=#d6d6d6
| 377242 ||  || — || January 21, 2004 || Socorro || LINEAR || — || align=right | 2.8 km || 
|-id=243 bgcolor=#d6d6d6
| 377243 ||  || — || January 24, 2004 || Socorro || LINEAR || EMA || align=right | 4.6 km || 
|-id=244 bgcolor=#d6d6d6
| 377244 ||  || — || January 28, 2004 || Kitt Peak || Spacewatch || — || align=right | 3.0 km || 
|-id=245 bgcolor=#fefefe
| 377245 ||  || — || January 23, 2004 || Socorro || LINEAR || ERI || align=right | 1.7 km || 
|-id=246 bgcolor=#fefefe
| 377246 ||  || — || January 28, 2004 || Socorro || LINEAR || H || align=right | 1.1 km || 
|-id=247 bgcolor=#d6d6d6
| 377247 ||  || — || January 28, 2004 || Catalina || CSS || — || align=right | 5.3 km || 
|-id=248 bgcolor=#d6d6d6
| 377248 ||  || — || January 30, 2004 || Kitt Peak || Spacewatch || — || align=right | 2.2 km || 
|-id=249 bgcolor=#E9E9E9
| 377249 ||  || — || January 18, 2004 || Palomar || NEAT || — || align=right | 1.00 km || 
|-id=250 bgcolor=#C2FFFF
| 377250 ||  || — || December 22, 2003 || Kitt Peak || Spacewatch || L5 || align=right | 12 km || 
|-id=251 bgcolor=#d6d6d6
| 377251 ||  || — || February 14, 2004 || Jonathan B. Postel || Jonathan B. Postel Obs. || — || align=right | 4.0 km || 
|-id=252 bgcolor=#d6d6d6
| 377252 ||  || — || February 13, 2004 || Kitt Peak || Spacewatch || LIX || align=right | 3.9 km || 
|-id=253 bgcolor=#fefefe
| 377253 ||  || — || February 13, 2004 || Kitt Peak || Spacewatch || NYS || align=right data-sort-value="0.78" | 780 m || 
|-id=254 bgcolor=#fefefe
| 377254 ||  || — || February 14, 2004 || Socorro || LINEAR || H || align=right data-sort-value="0.94" | 940 m || 
|-id=255 bgcolor=#d6d6d6
| 377255 ||  || — || February 12, 2004 || Kitt Peak || Spacewatch || 637 || align=right | 3.4 km || 
|-id=256 bgcolor=#fefefe
| 377256 ||  || — || February 13, 2004 || Kitt Peak || Spacewatch || — || align=right data-sort-value="0.70" | 700 m || 
|-id=257 bgcolor=#d6d6d6
| 377257 ||  || — || February 10, 2004 || Palomar || NEAT || — || align=right | 4.6 km || 
|-id=258 bgcolor=#d6d6d6
| 377258 ||  || — || February 12, 2004 || Kitt Peak || Spacewatch || — || align=right | 3.3 km || 
|-id=259 bgcolor=#d6d6d6
| 377259 ||  || — || February 14, 2004 || Kitt Peak || Spacewatch || THM || align=right | 2.7 km || 
|-id=260 bgcolor=#d6d6d6
| 377260 ||  || — || February 14, 2004 || Palomar || NEAT || — || align=right | 2.4 km || 
|-id=261 bgcolor=#fefefe
| 377261 ||  || — || February 15, 2004 || Socorro || LINEAR || — || align=right data-sort-value="0.81" | 810 m || 
|-id=262 bgcolor=#fefefe
| 377262 ||  || — || January 30, 2004 || Kitt Peak || Spacewatch || V || align=right data-sort-value="0.74" | 740 m || 
|-id=263 bgcolor=#fefefe
| 377263 ||  || — || February 18, 2004 || Socorro || LINEAR || H || align=right data-sort-value="0.63" | 630 m || 
|-id=264 bgcolor=#d6d6d6
| 377264 ||  || — || February 16, 2004 || Nogales || Tenagra II Obs. || — || align=right | 4.1 km || 
|-id=265 bgcolor=#fefefe
| 377265 ||  || — || February 16, 2004 || Kitt Peak || Spacewatch || V || align=right data-sort-value="0.75" | 750 m || 
|-id=266 bgcolor=#d6d6d6
| 377266 ||  || — || February 16, 2004 || Socorro || LINEAR || — || align=right | 3.0 km || 
|-id=267 bgcolor=#fefefe
| 377267 ||  || — || February 17, 2004 || Kitt Peak || Spacewatch || NYS || align=right data-sort-value="0.70" | 700 m || 
|-id=268 bgcolor=#fefefe
| 377268 ||  || — || February 18, 2004 || Desert Eagle || W. K. Y. Yeung || — || align=right data-sort-value="0.98" | 980 m || 
|-id=269 bgcolor=#fefefe
| 377269 ||  || — || February 22, 2004 || Kitt Peak || Spacewatch || NYS || align=right data-sort-value="0.76" | 760 m || 
|-id=270 bgcolor=#d6d6d6
| 377270 ||  || — || February 19, 2004 || Bergisch Gladbach || W. Bickel || — || align=right | 3.1 km || 
|-id=271 bgcolor=#d6d6d6
| 377271 ||  || — || February 22, 2004 || Kitt Peak || Spacewatch || VER || align=right | 3.4 km || 
|-id=272 bgcolor=#d6d6d6
| 377272 ||  || — || February 22, 2004 || Kitt Peak || Spacewatch || 637 || align=right | 2.6 km || 
|-id=273 bgcolor=#d6d6d6
| 377273 ||  || — || February 23, 2004 || Socorro || LINEAR || — || align=right | 2.4 km || 
|-id=274 bgcolor=#fefefe
| 377274 ||  || — || March 13, 2004 || Palomar || NEAT || ERI || align=right | 1.9 km || 
|-id=275 bgcolor=#d6d6d6
| 377275 ||  || — || March 10, 2004 || Palomar || NEAT || — || align=right | 4.0 km || 
|-id=276 bgcolor=#d6d6d6
| 377276 ||  || — || March 10, 2004 || Palomar || NEAT || — || align=right | 4.8 km || 
|-id=277 bgcolor=#fefefe
| 377277 ||  || — || March 12, 2004 || Palomar || NEAT || — || align=right | 1.2 km || 
|-id=278 bgcolor=#d6d6d6
| 377278 ||  || — || March 13, 2004 || Palomar || NEAT || — || align=right | 3.1 km || 
|-id=279 bgcolor=#fefefe
| 377279 ||  || — || March 12, 2004 || Palomar || NEAT || — || align=right | 1.0 km || 
|-id=280 bgcolor=#d6d6d6
| 377280 ||  || — || March 13, 2004 || Palomar || NEAT || — || align=right | 3.8 km || 
|-id=281 bgcolor=#d6d6d6
| 377281 ||  || — || March 15, 2004 || Socorro || LINEAR || — || align=right | 5.2 km || 
|-id=282 bgcolor=#d6d6d6
| 377282 ||  || — || March 15, 2004 || Socorro || LINEAR || — || align=right | 3.4 km || 
|-id=283 bgcolor=#fefefe
| 377283 ||  || — || March 12, 2004 || Palomar || NEAT || NYS || align=right data-sort-value="0.80" | 800 m || 
|-id=284 bgcolor=#fefefe
| 377284 ||  || — || March 15, 2004 || Kitt Peak || Spacewatch || NYS || align=right data-sort-value="0.76" | 760 m || 
|-id=285 bgcolor=#fefefe
| 377285 ||  || — || March 15, 2004 || Kitt Peak || Spacewatch || CLA || align=right | 1.9 km || 
|-id=286 bgcolor=#d6d6d6
| 377286 ||  || — || March 15, 2004 || Socorro || LINEAR || — || align=right | 4.5 km || 
|-id=287 bgcolor=#fefefe
| 377287 ||  || — || March 16, 2004 || Socorro || LINEAR || H || align=right data-sort-value="0.89" | 890 m || 
|-id=288 bgcolor=#fefefe
| 377288 ||  || — || March 17, 2004 || Kitt Peak || Spacewatch || — || align=right data-sort-value="0.99" | 990 m || 
|-id=289 bgcolor=#fefefe
| 377289 ||  || — || March 17, 2004 || Socorro || LINEAR || — || align=right | 1.5 km || 
|-id=290 bgcolor=#fefefe
| 377290 ||  || — || March 18, 2004 || Catalina || CSS || H || align=right data-sort-value="0.68" | 680 m || 
|-id=291 bgcolor=#d6d6d6
| 377291 ||  || — || March 18, 2004 || Socorro || LINEAR || — || align=right | 3.9 km || 
|-id=292 bgcolor=#d6d6d6
| 377292 ||  || — || March 17, 2004 || Kitt Peak || Spacewatch || — || align=right | 4.5 km || 
|-id=293 bgcolor=#d6d6d6
| 377293 ||  || — || March 17, 2004 || Kitt Peak || Spacewatch || — || align=right | 2.8 km || 
|-id=294 bgcolor=#fefefe
| 377294 ||  || — || March 19, 2004 || Socorro || LINEAR || NYS || align=right data-sort-value="0.77" | 770 m || 
|-id=295 bgcolor=#fefefe
| 377295 ||  || — || March 20, 2004 || Socorro || LINEAR || NYS || align=right data-sort-value="0.96" | 960 m || 
|-id=296 bgcolor=#d6d6d6
| 377296 ||  || — || March 19, 2004 || Kitt Peak || Spacewatch || THM || align=right | 2.1 km || 
|-id=297 bgcolor=#d6d6d6
| 377297 ||  || — || March 17, 2004 || Socorro || LINEAR || TIR || align=right | 3.5 km || 
|-id=298 bgcolor=#fefefe
| 377298 ||  || — || March 20, 2004 || Kitt Peak || Spacewatch || ERIcritical || align=right | 1.6 km || 
|-id=299 bgcolor=#fefefe
| 377299 ||  || — || March 21, 2004 || Kitt Peak || Spacewatch || — || align=right data-sort-value="0.95" | 950 m || 
|-id=300 bgcolor=#d6d6d6
| 377300 ||  || — || March 18, 2004 || Socorro || LINEAR || — || align=right | 4.4 km || 
|}

377301–377400 

|-bgcolor=#d6d6d6
| 377301 ||  || — || March 23, 2004 || Socorro || LINEAR || — || align=right | 4.1 km || 
|-id=302 bgcolor=#fefefe
| 377302 ||  || — || March 23, 2004 || Kitt Peak || Spacewatch || V || align=right data-sort-value="0.65" | 650 m || 
|-id=303 bgcolor=#fefefe
| 377303 ||  || — || March 20, 2004 || Siding Spring || SSS || — || align=right | 1.3 km || 
|-id=304 bgcolor=#d6d6d6
| 377304 ||  || — || March 28, 2004 || Socorro || LINEAR || Tj (2.96) || align=right | 4.1 km || 
|-id=305 bgcolor=#d6d6d6
| 377305 ||  || — || March 28, 2004 || Anderson Mesa || LONEOS || EUP || align=right | 6.3 km || 
|-id=306 bgcolor=#fefefe
| 377306 ||  || — || March 16, 2004 || Kitt Peak || Spacewatch || — || align=right data-sort-value="0.88" | 880 m || 
|-id=307 bgcolor=#fefefe
| 377307 ||  || — || April 9, 2004 || Siding Spring || SSS || MAS || align=right | 1.0 km || 
|-id=308 bgcolor=#fefefe
| 377308 ||  || — || April 9, 2004 || Siding Spring || SSS || — || align=right | 1.1 km || 
|-id=309 bgcolor=#fefefe
| 377309 ||  || — || April 15, 2004 || Anderson Mesa || LONEOS || NYS || align=right data-sort-value="0.72" | 720 m || 
|-id=310 bgcolor=#fefefe
| 377310 ||  || — || April 15, 2004 || Siding Spring || SSS || — || align=right | 1.2 km || 
|-id=311 bgcolor=#fefefe
| 377311 ||  || — || April 12, 2004 || Kitt Peak || Spacewatch || — || align=right data-sort-value="0.79" | 790 m || 
|-id=312 bgcolor=#fefefe
| 377312 ||  || — || April 16, 2004 || Kitt Peak || Spacewatch || NYS || align=right data-sort-value="0.63" | 630 m || 
|-id=313 bgcolor=#fefefe
| 377313 ||  || — || April 19, 2004 || Socorro || LINEAR || — || align=right | 1.2 km || 
|-id=314 bgcolor=#fefefe
| 377314 ||  || — || April 19, 2004 || Socorro || LINEAR || — || align=right data-sort-value="0.94" | 940 m || 
|-id=315 bgcolor=#E9E9E9
| 377315 ||  || — || April 22, 2004 || Reedy Creek || J. Broughton || JUN || align=right | 1.4 km || 
|-id=316 bgcolor=#fefefe
| 377316 ||  || — || April 19, 2004 || Socorro || LINEAR || V || align=right data-sort-value="0.89" | 890 m || 
|-id=317 bgcolor=#fefefe
| 377317 ||  || — || April 21, 2004 || Socorro || LINEAR || — || align=right data-sort-value="0.98" | 980 m || 
|-id=318 bgcolor=#fefefe
| 377318 ||  || — || April 22, 2004 || Socorro || LINEAR || NYS || align=right data-sort-value="0.99" | 990 m || 
|-id=319 bgcolor=#fefefe
| 377319 ||  || — || April 27, 2004 || Socorro || LINEAR || H || align=right | 1.0 km || 
|-id=320 bgcolor=#fefefe
| 377320 ||  || — || May 12, 2004 || Siding Spring || SSS || H || align=right data-sort-value="0.87" | 870 m || 
|-id=321 bgcolor=#E9E9E9
| 377321 ||  || — || May 12, 2004 || Palomar || NEAT || — || align=right | 3.2 km || 
|-id=322 bgcolor=#fefefe
| 377322 ||  || — || May 9, 2004 || Kitt Peak || Spacewatch || H || align=right data-sort-value="0.67" | 670 m || 
|-id=323 bgcolor=#E9E9E9
| 377323 ||  || — || June 11, 2004 || Anderson Mesa || LONEOS || — || align=right | 2.7 km || 
|-id=324 bgcolor=#E9E9E9
| 377324 ||  || — || June 20, 2004 || Socorro || LINEAR || JUN || align=right | 1.1 km || 
|-id=325 bgcolor=#E9E9E9
| 377325 ||  || — || July 9, 2004 || Socorro || LINEAR || — || align=right | 1.4 km || 
|-id=326 bgcolor=#E9E9E9
| 377326 ||  || — || July 9, 2004 || Siding Spring || SSS || — || align=right | 1.3 km || 
|-id=327 bgcolor=#E9E9E9
| 377327 ||  || — || July 11, 2004 || Socorro || LINEAR || — || align=right | 1.4 km || 
|-id=328 bgcolor=#E9E9E9
| 377328 ||  || — || July 14, 2004 || Socorro || LINEAR || — || align=right | 1.4 km || 
|-id=329 bgcolor=#E9E9E9
| 377329 ||  || — || July 11, 2004 || Socorro || LINEAR || EUN || align=right | 1.9 km || 
|-id=330 bgcolor=#E9E9E9
| 377330 ||  || — || July 16, 2004 || Socorro || LINEAR || JUN || align=right | 1.2 km || 
|-id=331 bgcolor=#FA8072
| 377331 ||  || — || July 21, 2004 || Reedy Creek || J. Broughton || — || align=right data-sort-value="0.74" | 740 m || 
|-id=332 bgcolor=#E9E9E9
| 377332 ||  || — || July 19, 2004 || Anderson Mesa || LONEOS || — || align=right | 1.8 km || 
|-id=333 bgcolor=#E9E9E9
| 377333 ||  || — || August 7, 2004 || Palomar || NEAT || — || align=right | 2.4 km || 
|-id=334 bgcolor=#E9E9E9
| 377334 ||  || — || August 8, 2004 || Socorro || LINEAR || — || align=right | 3.4 km || 
|-id=335 bgcolor=#E9E9E9
| 377335 ||  || — || August 9, 2004 || Anderson Mesa || LONEOS || — || align=right | 2.1 km || 
|-id=336 bgcolor=#E9E9E9
| 377336 ||  || — || August 8, 2004 || Socorro || LINEAR || — || align=right | 2.0 km || 
|-id=337 bgcolor=#E9E9E9
| 377337 ||  || — || August 8, 2004 || Socorro || LINEAR || — || align=right | 1.5 km || 
|-id=338 bgcolor=#E9E9E9
| 377338 ||  || — || August 8, 2004 || Socorro || LINEAR || — || align=right | 1.6 km || 
|-id=339 bgcolor=#E9E9E9
| 377339 ||  || — || August 10, 2004 || Anderson Mesa || LONEOS || — || align=right | 2.3 km || 
|-id=340 bgcolor=#E9E9E9
| 377340 ||  || — || August 12, 2004 || Socorro || LINEAR || — || align=right | 3.4 km || 
|-id=341 bgcolor=#E9E9E9
| 377341 ||  || — || August 12, 2004 || Siding Spring || SSS || JUN || align=right | 1.1 km || 
|-id=342 bgcolor=#E9E9E9
| 377342 ||  || — || August 12, 2004 || Socorro || LINEAR || EUN || align=right | 1.6 km || 
|-id=343 bgcolor=#E9E9E9
| 377343 ||  || — || August 20, 2004 || Socorro || LINEAR || HNS || align=right | 1.6 km || 
|-id=344 bgcolor=#E9E9E9
| 377344 ||  || — || August 23, 2004 || Kvistaberg || UDAS || — || align=right | 1.9 km || 
|-id=345 bgcolor=#E9E9E9
| 377345 ||  || — || September 6, 2004 || Palomar || NEAT || — || align=right | 2.5 km || 
|-id=346 bgcolor=#E9E9E9
| 377346 ||  || — || September 4, 2004 || Palomar || NEAT || — || align=right | 1.9 km || 
|-id=347 bgcolor=#E9E9E9
| 377347 ||  || — || September 6, 2004 || Siding Spring || SSS || — || align=right | 1.8 km || 
|-id=348 bgcolor=#E9E9E9
| 377348 ||  || — || August 9, 2004 || Anderson Mesa || LONEOS || — || align=right | 1.7 km || 
|-id=349 bgcolor=#E9E9E9
| 377349 ||  || — || September 7, 2004 || Socorro || LINEAR || — || align=right | 1.8 km || 
|-id=350 bgcolor=#E9E9E9
| 377350 ||  || — || September 7, 2004 || Kitt Peak || Spacewatch || — || align=right | 3.4 km || 
|-id=351 bgcolor=#E9E9E9
| 377351 ||  || — || September 8, 2004 || Socorro || LINEAR || — || align=right | 1.8 km || 
|-id=352 bgcolor=#E9E9E9
| 377352 ||  || — || September 8, 2004 || Socorro || LINEAR || — || align=right | 2.4 km || 
|-id=353 bgcolor=#E9E9E9
| 377353 ||  || — || September 8, 2004 || Socorro || LINEAR || EUN || align=right | 1.5 km || 
|-id=354 bgcolor=#E9E9E9
| 377354 ||  || — || September 8, 2004 || Socorro || LINEAR || — || align=right | 1.4 km || 
|-id=355 bgcolor=#E9E9E9
| 377355 ||  || — || September 8, 2004 || Socorro || LINEAR || — || align=right | 1.9 km || 
|-id=356 bgcolor=#E9E9E9
| 377356 ||  || — || September 8, 2004 || Socorro || LINEAR || — || align=right | 2.0 km || 
|-id=357 bgcolor=#E9E9E9
| 377357 ||  || — || September 8, 2004 || Socorro || LINEAR || — || align=right | 1.9 km || 
|-id=358 bgcolor=#E9E9E9
| 377358 ||  || — || September 8, 2004 || Socorro || LINEAR || — || align=right | 1.9 km || 
|-id=359 bgcolor=#E9E9E9
| 377359 ||  || — || September 8, 2004 || Socorro || LINEAR || — || align=right | 2.1 km || 
|-id=360 bgcolor=#E9E9E9
| 377360 ||  || — || September 7, 2004 || Socorro || LINEAR || — || align=right | 1.6 km || 
|-id=361 bgcolor=#E9E9E9
| 377361 ||  || — || September 8, 2004 || Socorro || LINEAR || IAN || align=right data-sort-value="0.84" | 840 m || 
|-id=362 bgcolor=#E9E9E9
| 377362 ||  || — || September 8, 2004 || Palomar || NEAT || ADE || align=right | 2.5 km || 
|-id=363 bgcolor=#E9E9E9
| 377363 ||  || — || September 11, 2004 || Desert Moon || B. L. Stevens || — || align=right | 1.9 km || 
|-id=364 bgcolor=#E9E9E9
| 377364 ||  || — || September 6, 2004 || Socorro || LINEAR || — || align=right | 2.9 km || 
|-id=365 bgcolor=#E9E9E9
| 377365 ||  || — || September 6, 2004 || Bergisch Gladbac || W. Bickel || — || align=right | 1.3 km || 
|-id=366 bgcolor=#E9E9E9
| 377366 ||  || — || September 7, 2004 || Socorro || LINEAR || — || align=right | 2.8 km || 
|-id=367 bgcolor=#E9E9E9
| 377367 ||  || — || September 7, 2004 || Kitt Peak || Spacewatch || — || align=right | 1.5 km || 
|-id=368 bgcolor=#E9E9E9
| 377368 ||  || — || September 8, 2004 || Socorro || LINEAR || — || align=right | 1.7 km || 
|-id=369 bgcolor=#E9E9E9
| 377369 ||  || — || September 9, 2004 || Socorro || LINEAR || — || align=right | 1.8 km || 
|-id=370 bgcolor=#E9E9E9
| 377370 ||  || — || September 10, 2004 || Socorro || LINEAR || — || align=right | 1.5 km || 
|-id=371 bgcolor=#E9E9E9
| 377371 ||  || — || September 10, 2004 || Socorro || LINEAR || — || align=right | 1.7 km || 
|-id=372 bgcolor=#E9E9E9
| 377372 ||  || — || September 10, 2004 || Socorro || LINEAR || — || align=right | 1.3 km || 
|-id=373 bgcolor=#E9E9E9
| 377373 ||  || — || September 10, 2004 || Socorro || LINEAR || — || align=right | 1.5 km || 
|-id=374 bgcolor=#E9E9E9
| 377374 ||  || — || September 10, 2004 || Socorro || LINEAR || — || align=right | 2.2 km || 
|-id=375 bgcolor=#E9E9E9
| 377375 ||  || — || September 11, 2004 || Socorro || LINEAR || ADE || align=right | 2.4 km || 
|-id=376 bgcolor=#E9E9E9
| 377376 ||  || — || September 11, 2004 || Kitt Peak || Spacewatch || AER || align=right | 1.1 km || 
|-id=377 bgcolor=#E9E9E9
| 377377 ||  || — || September 12, 2004 || Kitt Peak || Spacewatch || ADE || align=right | 2.1 km || 
|-id=378 bgcolor=#E9E9E9
| 377378 ||  || — || August 20, 2004 || Catalina || CSS || JUN || align=right | 1.1 km || 
|-id=379 bgcolor=#E9E9E9
| 377379 ||  || — || September 11, 2004 || Socorro || LINEAR || MAR || align=right | 1.6 km || 
|-id=380 bgcolor=#E9E9E9
| 377380 ||  || — || September 11, 2004 || Socorro || LINEAR || — || align=right | 2.0 km || 
|-id=381 bgcolor=#E9E9E9
| 377381 ||  || — || September 11, 2004 || Socorro || LINEAR || — || align=right | 1.4 km || 
|-id=382 bgcolor=#E9E9E9
| 377382 ||  || — || September 11, 2004 || Socorro || LINEAR || — || align=right | 1.7 km || 
|-id=383 bgcolor=#E9E9E9
| 377383 ||  || — || September 11, 2004 || Socorro || LINEAR || — || align=right | 2.5 km || 
|-id=384 bgcolor=#E9E9E9
| 377384 ||  || — || August 21, 2004 || Catalina || CSS || — || align=right | 2.2 km || 
|-id=385 bgcolor=#E9E9E9
| 377385 ||  || — || September 10, 2004 || Kitt Peak || Spacewatch || — || align=right | 1.6 km || 
|-id=386 bgcolor=#E9E9E9
| 377386 ||  || — || September 11, 2004 || Kitt Peak || Spacewatch || — || align=right | 1.5 km || 
|-id=387 bgcolor=#E9E9E9
| 377387 ||  || — || September 15, 2004 || 7300 Observatory || W. K. Y. Yeung || — || align=right | 1.6 km || 
|-id=388 bgcolor=#E9E9E9
| 377388 ||  || — || September 13, 2004 || Kitt Peak || Spacewatch || — || align=right | 1.5 km || 
|-id=389 bgcolor=#E9E9E9
| 377389 ||  || — || September 13, 2004 || Palomar || NEAT || JUN || align=right | 1.2 km || 
|-id=390 bgcolor=#E9E9E9
| 377390 ||  || — || September 11, 2004 || Socorro || LINEAR || — || align=right | 2.4 km || 
|-id=391 bgcolor=#E9E9E9
| 377391 ||  || — || September 13, 2004 || Palomar || NEAT || WIT || align=right | 1.3 km || 
|-id=392 bgcolor=#E9E9E9
| 377392 ||  || — || September 15, 2004 || Kitt Peak || Spacewatch || — || align=right | 1.4 km || 
|-id=393 bgcolor=#E9E9E9
| 377393 ||  || — || September 15, 2004 || Kitt Peak || Spacewatch || NEM || align=right | 2.0 km || 
|-id=394 bgcolor=#E9E9E9
| 377394 ||  || — || September 7, 2004 || Palomar || NEAT || — || align=right | 3.0 km || 
|-id=395 bgcolor=#E9E9E9
| 377395 ||  || — || September 12, 2004 || Mauna Kea || P. A. Wiegert || — || align=right | 1.5 km || 
|-id=396 bgcolor=#E9E9E9
| 377396 ||  || — || September 11, 2004 || Kitt Peak || Spacewatch || — || align=right | 1.3 km || 
|-id=397 bgcolor=#E9E9E9
| 377397 ||  || — || September 3, 2004 || Siding Spring || SSS || — || align=right | 1.7 km || 
|-id=398 bgcolor=#E9E9E9
| 377398 ||  || — || September 16, 2004 || Kitt Peak || Spacewatch || — || align=right | 1.6 km || 
|-id=399 bgcolor=#E9E9E9
| 377399 ||  || — || September 17, 2004 || Socorro || LINEAR || MAR || align=right | 1.4 km || 
|-id=400 bgcolor=#E9E9E9
| 377400 ||  || — || September 17, 2004 || Socorro || LINEAR || — || align=right | 1.8 km || 
|}

377401–377500 

|-bgcolor=#E9E9E9
| 377401 ||  || — || September 7, 2004 || Kitt Peak || Spacewatch || — || align=right | 2.4 km || 
|-id=402 bgcolor=#E9E9E9
| 377402 ||  || — || September 22, 2004 || Socorro || LINEAR || — || align=right | 1.7 km || 
|-id=403 bgcolor=#E9E9E9
| 377403 ||  || — || October 4, 2004 || Kitt Peak || Spacewatch || — || align=right | 1.4 km || 
|-id=404 bgcolor=#E9E9E9
| 377404 ||  || — || October 4, 2004 || Kitt Peak || Spacewatch || MRX || align=right data-sort-value="0.99" | 990 m || 
|-id=405 bgcolor=#E9E9E9
| 377405 ||  || — || October 4, 2004 || Kitt Peak || Spacewatch || — || align=right | 1.6 km || 
|-id=406 bgcolor=#E9E9E9
| 377406 ||  || — || October 5, 2004 || Kitt Peak || Spacewatch || — || align=right | 1.5 km || 
|-id=407 bgcolor=#E9E9E9
| 377407 ||  || — || September 17, 2004 || Kitt Peak || Spacewatch || — || align=right | 2.4 km || 
|-id=408 bgcolor=#E9E9E9
| 377408 ||  || — || October 5, 2004 || Anderson Mesa || LONEOS || NEM || align=right | 2.8 km || 
|-id=409 bgcolor=#E9E9E9
| 377409 ||  || — || October 5, 2004 || Anderson Mesa || LONEOS || — || align=right | 2.9 km || 
|-id=410 bgcolor=#E9E9E9
| 377410 ||  || — || October 6, 2004 || Kitt Peak || Spacewatch || — || align=right | 2.6 km || 
|-id=411 bgcolor=#E9E9E9
| 377411 ||  || — || October 5, 2004 || Kitt Peak || Spacewatch || HEN || align=right data-sort-value="0.97" | 970 m || 
|-id=412 bgcolor=#E9E9E9
| 377412 ||  || — || September 17, 2004 || Socorro || LINEAR || GEF || align=right | 1.5 km || 
|-id=413 bgcolor=#E9E9E9
| 377413 ||  || — || October 7, 2004 || Kitt Peak || Spacewatch || AEO || align=right data-sort-value="0.98" | 980 m || 
|-id=414 bgcolor=#E9E9E9
| 377414 ||  || — || October 7, 2004 || Socorro || LINEAR || EUN || align=right | 1.6 km || 
|-id=415 bgcolor=#E9E9E9
| 377415 ||  || — || October 7, 2004 || Palomar || NEAT || GEF || align=right | 1.6 km || 
|-id=416 bgcolor=#E9E9E9
| 377416 ||  || — || October 7, 2004 || Kitt Peak || Spacewatch || — || align=right | 2.2 km || 
|-id=417 bgcolor=#E9E9E9
| 377417 ||  || — || October 4, 2004 || Anderson Mesa || LONEOS || — || align=right | 2.6 km || 
|-id=418 bgcolor=#E9E9E9
| 377418 ||  || — || October 7, 2004 || Anderson Mesa || LONEOS || — || align=right | 1.5 km || 
|-id=419 bgcolor=#E9E9E9
| 377419 ||  || — || October 7, 2004 || Socorro || LINEAR || — || align=right | 1.9 km || 
|-id=420 bgcolor=#E9E9E9
| 377420 ||  || — || October 7, 2004 || Palomar || NEAT || ADE || align=right | 3.0 km || 
|-id=421 bgcolor=#E9E9E9
| 377421 ||  || — || September 13, 2004 || Socorro || LINEAR || — || align=right | 1.9 km || 
|-id=422 bgcolor=#E9E9E9
| 377422 ||  || — || October 6, 2004 || Kitt Peak || Spacewatch || — || align=right | 2.0 km || 
|-id=423 bgcolor=#E9E9E9
| 377423 ||  || — || October 6, 2004 || Kitt Peak || Spacewatch || HEN || align=right | 1.1 km || 
|-id=424 bgcolor=#E9E9E9
| 377424 ||  || — || September 13, 2004 || Socorro || LINEAR || AEO || align=right | 1.1 km || 
|-id=425 bgcolor=#E9E9E9
| 377425 ||  || — || October 7, 2004 || Kitt Peak || Spacewatch || — || align=right | 1.5 km || 
|-id=426 bgcolor=#E9E9E9
| 377426 ||  || — || October 7, 2004 || Kitt Peak || Spacewatch || — || align=right | 1.4 km || 
|-id=427 bgcolor=#E9E9E9
| 377427 ||  || — || September 10, 2004 || Kitt Peak || Spacewatch || — || align=right | 1.4 km || 
|-id=428 bgcolor=#E9E9E9
| 377428 ||  || — || October 7, 2004 || Kitt Peak || Spacewatch || HOF || align=right | 2.6 km || 
|-id=429 bgcolor=#E9E9E9
| 377429 ||  || — || October 7, 2004 || Kitt Peak || Spacewatch || — || align=right | 2.3 km || 
|-id=430 bgcolor=#E9E9E9
| 377430 ||  || — || October 7, 2004 || Kitt Peak || Spacewatch || — || align=right | 2.5 km || 
|-id=431 bgcolor=#E9E9E9
| 377431 ||  || — || October 7, 2004 || Kitt Peak || Spacewatch || AGN || align=right | 1.2 km || 
|-id=432 bgcolor=#E9E9E9
| 377432 ||  || — || October 9, 2004 || Kitt Peak || Spacewatch || — || align=right | 1.8 km || 
|-id=433 bgcolor=#E9E9E9
| 377433 ||  || — || October 5, 2004 || Palomar || NEAT || — || align=right | 2.6 km || 
|-id=434 bgcolor=#E9E9E9
| 377434 ||  || — || May 2, 2003 || Kitt Peak || Spacewatch || EUN || align=right | 1.5 km || 
|-id=435 bgcolor=#E9E9E9
| 377435 ||  || — || October 8, 2004 || Kitt Peak || Spacewatch || — || align=right | 2.2 km || 
|-id=436 bgcolor=#E9E9E9
| 377436 ||  || — || September 18, 2004 || Socorro || LINEAR || GEF || align=right | 1.4 km || 
|-id=437 bgcolor=#E9E9E9
| 377437 ||  || — || October 9, 2004 || Kitt Peak || Spacewatch || WIT || align=right | 1.3 km || 
|-id=438 bgcolor=#E9E9E9
| 377438 ||  || — || October 9, 2004 || Kitt Peak || Spacewatch || — || align=right | 2.4 km || 
|-id=439 bgcolor=#E9E9E9
| 377439 ||  || — || October 10, 2004 || Kitt Peak || Spacewatch || — || align=right | 1.8 km || 
|-id=440 bgcolor=#E9E9E9
| 377440 ||  || — || October 10, 2004 || Kitt Peak || Spacewatch || — || align=right | 2.6 km || 
|-id=441 bgcolor=#E9E9E9
| 377441 ||  || — || October 10, 2004 || Socorro || LINEAR || — || align=right | 2.4 km || 
|-id=442 bgcolor=#E9E9E9
| 377442 ||  || — || October 7, 2004 || Kitt Peak || Spacewatch || — || align=right | 2.3 km || 
|-id=443 bgcolor=#E9E9E9
| 377443 ||  || — || October 11, 2004 || Kitt Peak || Spacewatch || — || align=right | 3.1 km || 
|-id=444 bgcolor=#E9E9E9
| 377444 ||  || — || October 11, 2004 || Kitt Peak || Spacewatch || HOF || align=right | 2.8 km || 
|-id=445 bgcolor=#E9E9E9
| 377445 ||  || — || October 12, 2004 || Kitt Peak || Spacewatch || — || align=right | 2.8 km || 
|-id=446 bgcolor=#E9E9E9
| 377446 ||  || — || October 6, 2004 || Kitt Peak || Spacewatch || — || align=right | 2.6 km || 
|-id=447 bgcolor=#E9E9E9
| 377447 ||  || — || October 7, 2004 || Kitt Peak || Spacewatch || — || align=right | 1.8 km || 
|-id=448 bgcolor=#E9E9E9
| 377448 ||  || — || October 9, 2004 || Anderson Mesa || LONEOS || — || align=right | 3.3 km || 
|-id=449 bgcolor=#E9E9E9
| 377449 ||  || — || November 3, 2004 || Catalina || CSS || INO || align=right | 1.5 km || 
|-id=450 bgcolor=#E9E9E9
| 377450 ||  || — || November 4, 2004 || Catalina || CSS || INO || align=right | 1.5 km || 
|-id=451 bgcolor=#E9E9E9
| 377451 ||  || — || November 3, 2004 || Kitt Peak || Spacewatch || — || align=right | 2.3 km || 
|-id=452 bgcolor=#E9E9E9
| 377452 ||  || — || October 15, 2004 || Mount Lemmon || Mount Lemmon Survey || — || align=right | 2.3 km || 
|-id=453 bgcolor=#E9E9E9
| 377453 ||  || — || November 4, 2004 || Kitt Peak || Spacewatch || — || align=right | 3.2 km || 
|-id=454 bgcolor=#E9E9E9
| 377454 ||  || — || November 4, 2004 || Kitt Peak || Spacewatch || — || align=right | 2.9 km || 
|-id=455 bgcolor=#E9E9E9
| 377455 ||  || — || November 5, 2004 || Palomar || NEAT || — || align=right | 2.9 km || 
|-id=456 bgcolor=#E9E9E9
| 377456 ||  || — || November 12, 2004 || Catalina || CSS || — || align=right | 2.4 km || 
|-id=457 bgcolor=#E9E9E9
| 377457 ||  || — || November 3, 2004 || Kitt Peak || Spacewatch || — || align=right | 1.4 km || 
|-id=458 bgcolor=#E9E9E9
| 377458 ||  || — || November 3, 2004 || Palomar || NEAT || — || align=right | 1.5 km || 
|-id=459 bgcolor=#E9E9E9
| 377459 ||  || — || November 19, 2004 || Socorro || LINEAR || — || align=right | 1.9 km || 
|-id=460 bgcolor=#E9E9E9
| 377460 ||  || — || November 19, 2004 || Socorro || LINEAR || — || align=right | 2.3 km || 
|-id=461 bgcolor=#E9E9E9
| 377461 ||  || — || December 3, 2004 || Kitt Peak || Spacewatch || — || align=right | 3.6 km || 
|-id=462 bgcolor=#E9E9E9
| 377462 ||  || — || December 10, 2004 || Socorro || LINEAR || — || align=right | 3.2 km || 
|-id=463 bgcolor=#FA8072
| 377463 ||  || — || December 7, 2004 || Socorro || LINEAR || — || align=right | 2.5 km || 
|-id=464 bgcolor=#E9E9E9
| 377464 ||  || — || December 10, 2004 || Socorro || LINEAR || — || align=right | 2.8 km || 
|-id=465 bgcolor=#E9E9E9
| 377465 ||  || — || December 10, 2004 || Socorro || LINEAR || — || align=right | 2.9 km || 
|-id=466 bgcolor=#E9E9E9
| 377466 ||  || — || December 10, 2004 || Kitt Peak || Spacewatch || GEF || align=right | 1.7 km || 
|-id=467 bgcolor=#E9E9E9
| 377467 ||  || — || December 11, 2004 || Socorro || LINEAR || — || align=right | 3.3 km || 
|-id=468 bgcolor=#E9E9E9
| 377468 ||  || — || December 11, 2004 || Socorro || LINEAR || — || align=right | 2.8 km || 
|-id=469 bgcolor=#E9E9E9
| 377469 ||  || — || December 11, 2004 || Socorro || LINEAR || — || align=right | 2.3 km || 
|-id=470 bgcolor=#FA8072
| 377470 ||  || — || December 15, 2004 || Socorro || LINEAR || — || align=right | 3.5 km || 
|-id=471 bgcolor=#C2FFFF
| 377471 ||  || — || December 18, 2004 || Mount Lemmon || Mount Lemmon Survey || L5 || align=right | 11 km || 
|-id=472 bgcolor=#d6d6d6
| 377472 ||  || — || December 18, 2004 || Mount Lemmon || Mount Lemmon Survey || — || align=right | 2.1 km || 
|-id=473 bgcolor=#E9E9E9
| 377473 || 2005 AQ || — || January 6, 2005 || Pla D'Arguines || R. Ferrando || DOR || align=right | 2.4 km || 
|-id=474 bgcolor=#d6d6d6
| 377474 ||  || — || December 18, 2004 || Mount Lemmon || Mount Lemmon Survey || — || align=right | 4.7 km || 
|-id=475 bgcolor=#C2FFFF
| 377475 ||  || — || January 15, 2005 || Kitt Peak || Spacewatch || L5 || align=right | 11 km || 
|-id=476 bgcolor=#fefefe
| 377476 ||  || — || January 15, 2005 || Kitt Peak || Spacewatch || — || align=right data-sort-value="0.76" | 760 m || 
|-id=477 bgcolor=#fefefe
| 377477 ||  || — || January 16, 2005 || Mauna Kea || C. Veillet || — || align=right data-sort-value="0.65" | 650 m || 
|-id=478 bgcolor=#fefefe
| 377478 ||  || — || February 1, 2005 || Kitt Peak || Spacewatch || — || align=right data-sort-value="0.61" | 610 m || 
|-id=479 bgcolor=#d6d6d6
| 377479 ||  || — || February 2, 2005 || Kitt Peak || Spacewatch || URS || align=right | 4.7 km || 
|-id=480 bgcolor=#d6d6d6
| 377480 ||  || — || February 2, 2005 || Socorro || LINEAR || — || align=right | 4.4 km || 
|-id=481 bgcolor=#d6d6d6
| 377481 ||  || — || February 9, 2005 || Kitt Peak || Spacewatch || — || align=right | 4.1 km || 
|-id=482 bgcolor=#d6d6d6
| 377482 ||  || — || March 1, 2005 || Kitt Peak || Spacewatch || — || align=right | 4.4 km || 
|-id=483 bgcolor=#d6d6d6
| 377483 ||  || — || March 3, 2005 || Kitt Peak || Spacewatch || — || align=right | 3.7 km || 
|-id=484 bgcolor=#d6d6d6
| 377484 ||  || — || March 3, 2005 || Kitt Peak || Spacewatch || — || align=right | 3.0 km || 
|-id=485 bgcolor=#fefefe
| 377485 ||  || — || March 1, 2005 || Kitt Peak || Spacewatch || — || align=right data-sort-value="0.77" | 770 m || 
|-id=486 bgcolor=#d6d6d6
| 377486 ||  || — || March 1, 2005 || Kitt Peak || Spacewatch || EOS || align=right | 2.2 km || 
|-id=487 bgcolor=#fefefe
| 377487 ||  || — || March 3, 2005 || Catalina || CSS || — || align=right | 1.1 km || 
|-id=488 bgcolor=#fefefe
| 377488 ||  || — || March 3, 2005 || Catalina || CSS || FLO || align=right data-sort-value="0.74" | 740 m || 
|-id=489 bgcolor=#fefefe
| 377489 ||  || — || March 4, 2005 || Catalina || CSS || — || align=right | 2.1 km || 
|-id=490 bgcolor=#d6d6d6
| 377490 ||  || — || March 3, 2005 || Kitt Peak || Spacewatch || — || align=right | 3.0 km || 
|-id=491 bgcolor=#d6d6d6
| 377491 ||  || — || March 4, 2005 || Kitt Peak || Spacewatch || THM || align=right | 2.1 km || 
|-id=492 bgcolor=#fefefe
| 377492 ||  || — || March 4, 2005 || Kitt Peak || Spacewatch || — || align=right data-sort-value="0.64" | 640 m || 
|-id=493 bgcolor=#C2FFFF
| 377493 ||  || — || March 8, 2005 || Mount Lemmon || Mount Lemmon Survey || L5 || align=right | 8.5 km || 
|-id=494 bgcolor=#fefefe
| 377494 ||  || — || March 10, 2005 || Mount Lemmon || Mount Lemmon Survey || — || align=right data-sort-value="0.80" | 800 m || 
|-id=495 bgcolor=#d6d6d6
| 377495 ||  || — || March 10, 2005 || Mount Lemmon || Mount Lemmon Survey || EMA || align=right | 3.4 km || 
|-id=496 bgcolor=#d6d6d6
| 377496 ||  || — || March 10, 2005 || Mount Lemmon || Mount Lemmon Survey || — || align=right | 2.3 km || 
|-id=497 bgcolor=#fefefe
| 377497 ||  || — || March 10, 2005 || Mount Lemmon || Mount Lemmon Survey || FLO || align=right data-sort-value="0.61" | 610 m || 
|-id=498 bgcolor=#d6d6d6
| 377498 ||  || — || March 10, 2005 || Kitt Peak || Spacewatch || EOS || align=right | 2.7 km || 
|-id=499 bgcolor=#d6d6d6
| 377499 ||  || — || March 10, 2005 || Kitt Peak || Spacewatch || — || align=right | 2.5 km || 
|-id=500 bgcolor=#d6d6d6
| 377500 ||  || — || March 9, 2005 || Mount Lemmon || Mount Lemmon Survey || — || align=right | 3.2 km || 
|}

377501–377600 

|-bgcolor=#d6d6d6
| 377501 ||  || — || March 9, 2005 || Mount Lemmon || Mount Lemmon Survey || — || align=right | 2.4 km || 
|-id=502 bgcolor=#d6d6d6
| 377502 ||  || — || March 9, 2005 || Mount Lemmon || Mount Lemmon Survey || — || align=right | 3.3 km || 
|-id=503 bgcolor=#d6d6d6
| 377503 ||  || — || March 9, 2005 || Mount Lemmon || Mount Lemmon Survey || HYG || align=right | 2.8 km || 
|-id=504 bgcolor=#d6d6d6
| 377504 ||  || — || March 8, 2005 || Mount Lemmon || Mount Lemmon Survey || — || align=right | 2.1 km || 
|-id=505 bgcolor=#d6d6d6
| 377505 ||  || — || March 9, 2005 || Kitt Peak || Spacewatch || — || align=right | 4.5 km || 
|-id=506 bgcolor=#d6d6d6
| 377506 ||  || — || March 9, 2005 || Mount Lemmon || Mount Lemmon Survey || — || align=right | 2.1 km || 
|-id=507 bgcolor=#d6d6d6
| 377507 ||  || — || March 4, 2005 || Mount Lemmon || Mount Lemmon Survey || EOS || align=right | 2.1 km || 
|-id=508 bgcolor=#fefefe
| 377508 ||  || — || March 10, 2005 || Mount Lemmon || Mount Lemmon Survey || — || align=right data-sort-value="0.75" | 750 m || 
|-id=509 bgcolor=#d6d6d6
| 377509 ||  || — || March 11, 2005 || Kitt Peak || Spacewatch || — || align=right | 4.7 km || 
|-id=510 bgcolor=#d6d6d6
| 377510 ||  || — || March 11, 2005 || Mount Lemmon || Mount Lemmon Survey || — || align=right | 2.7 km || 
|-id=511 bgcolor=#d6d6d6
| 377511 ||  || — || March 11, 2005 || Mount Lemmon || Mount Lemmon Survey || — || align=right | 3.1 km || 
|-id=512 bgcolor=#d6d6d6
| 377512 ||  || — || March 15, 2005 || Catalina || CSS || EOS || align=right | 2.7 km || 
|-id=513 bgcolor=#d6d6d6
| 377513 ||  || — || March 10, 2005 || Kitt Peak || M. W. Buie || — || align=right | 3.4 km || 
|-id=514 bgcolor=#fefefe
| 377514 ||  || — || March 18, 2005 || Catalina || CSS || — || align=right data-sort-value="0.87" | 870 m || 
|-id=515 bgcolor=#fefefe
| 377515 ||  || — || April 2, 2005 || Mayhill || A. Lowe || — || align=right data-sort-value="0.74" | 740 m || 
|-id=516 bgcolor=#d6d6d6
| 377516 ||  || — || April 1, 2005 || Kitt Peak || Spacewatch || — || align=right | 5.3 km || 
|-id=517 bgcolor=#fefefe
| 377517 ||  || — || April 1, 2005 || Anderson Mesa || LONEOS || FLO || align=right data-sort-value="0.88" | 880 m || 
|-id=518 bgcolor=#fefefe
| 377518 ||  || — || March 11, 2005 || Mount Lemmon || Mount Lemmon Survey || — || align=right data-sort-value="0.62" | 620 m || 
|-id=519 bgcolor=#fefefe
| 377519 ||  || — || April 2, 2005 || Mount Lemmon || Mount Lemmon Survey || — || align=right data-sort-value="0.66" | 660 m || 
|-id=520 bgcolor=#fefefe
| 377520 ||  || — || April 2, 2005 || Mount Lemmon || Mount Lemmon Survey || — || align=right data-sort-value="0.81" | 810 m || 
|-id=521 bgcolor=#fefefe
| 377521 ||  || — || April 2, 2005 || Palomar || NEAT || — || align=right data-sort-value="0.88" | 880 m || 
|-id=522 bgcolor=#d6d6d6
| 377522 ||  || — || April 2, 2005 || Mount Lemmon || Mount Lemmon Survey || VER || align=right | 2.3 km || 
|-id=523 bgcolor=#d6d6d6
| 377523 ||  || — || April 2, 2005 || Mount Lemmon || Mount Lemmon Survey || — || align=right | 3.0 km || 
|-id=524 bgcolor=#d6d6d6
| 377524 ||  || — || April 2, 2005 || Mount Lemmon || Mount Lemmon Survey || EOS || align=right | 2.0 km || 
|-id=525 bgcolor=#fefefe
| 377525 ||  || — || March 10, 2005 || Catalina || CSS || — || align=right data-sort-value="0.99" | 990 m || 
|-id=526 bgcolor=#fefefe
| 377526 ||  || — || April 6, 2005 || Catalina || CSS || — || align=right | 1.1 km || 
|-id=527 bgcolor=#fefefe
| 377527 ||  || — || April 5, 2005 || Palomar || NEAT || — || align=right data-sort-value="0.76" | 760 m || 
|-id=528 bgcolor=#d6d6d6
| 377528 ||  || — || April 10, 2005 || Kitt Peak || Spacewatch || — || align=right | 3.5 km || 
|-id=529 bgcolor=#fefefe
| 377529 ||  || — || April 6, 2005 || Kitt Peak || Spacewatch || FLO || align=right data-sort-value="0.69" | 690 m || 
|-id=530 bgcolor=#d6d6d6
| 377530 ||  || — || April 10, 2005 || Mount Lemmon || Mount Lemmon Survey || — || align=right | 3.5 km || 
|-id=531 bgcolor=#d6d6d6
| 377531 ||  || — || April 9, 2005 || Mount Lemmon || Mount Lemmon Survey || — || align=right | 2.3 km || 
|-id=532 bgcolor=#fefefe
| 377532 ||  || — || April 10, 2005 || Kitt Peak || Spacewatch || — || align=right data-sort-value="0.73" | 730 m || 
|-id=533 bgcolor=#d6d6d6
| 377533 ||  || — || April 2, 2005 || Kitt Peak || Spacewatch || — || align=right | 4.1 km || 
|-id=534 bgcolor=#d6d6d6
| 377534 ||  || — || April 10, 2005 || Mount Lemmon || Mount Lemmon Survey || HYG || align=right | 4.5 km || 
|-id=535 bgcolor=#d6d6d6
| 377535 ||  || — || April 12, 2005 || Kitt Peak || Spacewatch || EOS || align=right | 2.6 km || 
|-id=536 bgcolor=#d6d6d6
| 377536 ||  || — || April 4, 2005 || Catalina || CSS || — || align=right | 4.3 km || 
|-id=537 bgcolor=#fefefe
| 377537 ||  || — || April 14, 2005 || Kitt Peak || Spacewatch || NYS || align=right data-sort-value="0.58" | 580 m || 
|-id=538 bgcolor=#d6d6d6
| 377538 ||  || — || April 15, 2005 || Kitt Peak || Spacewatch || — || align=right | 3.1 km || 
|-id=539 bgcolor=#d6d6d6
| 377539 ||  || — || April 12, 2005 || Kitt Peak || Spacewatch || — || align=right | 2.9 km || 
|-id=540 bgcolor=#d6d6d6
| 377540 ||  || — || April 4, 2005 || Mount Lemmon || Mount Lemmon Survey || — || align=right | 3.1 km || 
|-id=541 bgcolor=#fefefe
| 377541 ||  || — || April 6, 2005 || Mount Lemmon || Mount Lemmon Survey || — || align=right data-sort-value="0.73" | 730 m || 
|-id=542 bgcolor=#d6d6d6
| 377542 ||  || — || April 11, 2005 || Kitt Peak || M. W. Buie || — || align=right | 3.1 km || 
|-id=543 bgcolor=#d6d6d6
| 377543 ||  || — || April 2, 2005 || Catalina || CSS || — || align=right | 3.9 km || 
|-id=544 bgcolor=#d6d6d6
| 377544 ||  || — || April 2, 2005 || Kitt Peak || Spacewatch || — || align=right | 4.3 km || 
|-id=545 bgcolor=#fefefe
| 377545 ||  || — || April 27, 2005 || Campo Imperatore || CINEOS || — || align=right | 1.3 km || 
|-id=546 bgcolor=#d6d6d6
| 377546 ||  || — || April 17, 2005 || Kitt Peak || Spacewatch || — || align=right | 2.9 km || 
|-id=547 bgcolor=#fefefe
| 377547 ||  || — || May 4, 2005 || Mauna Kea || C. Veillet || V || align=right data-sort-value="0.51" | 510 m || 
|-id=548 bgcolor=#d6d6d6
| 377548 ||  || — || May 4, 2005 || Mount Lemmon || Mount Lemmon Survey || TIR || align=right | 3.0 km || 
|-id=549 bgcolor=#d6d6d6
| 377549 ||  || — || May 3, 2005 || Kitt Peak || Spacewatch || EOS || align=right | 2.4 km || 
|-id=550 bgcolor=#d6d6d6
| 377550 ||  || — || May 4, 2005 || Kitt Peak || Spacewatch || — || align=right | 2.8 km || 
|-id=551 bgcolor=#d6d6d6
| 377551 ||  || — || May 8, 2005 || Kitt Peak || Spacewatch || — || align=right | 4.4 km || 
|-id=552 bgcolor=#d6d6d6
| 377552 ||  || — || May 3, 2005 || Kitt Peak || Spacewatch || EOS || align=right | 2.8 km || 
|-id=553 bgcolor=#fefefe
| 377553 ||  || — || May 4, 2005 || Kitt Peak || Spacewatch || — || align=right data-sort-value="0.90" | 900 m || 
|-id=554 bgcolor=#d6d6d6
| 377554 ||  || — || May 6, 2005 || Kitt Peak || Spacewatch || EUP || align=right | 4.1 km || 
|-id=555 bgcolor=#fefefe
| 377555 ||  || — || May 9, 2005 || Mount Lemmon || Mount Lemmon Survey || NYS || align=right data-sort-value="0.54" | 540 m || 
|-id=556 bgcolor=#fefefe
| 377556 ||  || — || April 11, 2005 || Mount Lemmon || Mount Lemmon Survey || MAS || align=right data-sort-value="0.78" | 780 m || 
|-id=557 bgcolor=#fefefe
| 377557 ||  || — || May 10, 2005 || Mount Lemmon || Mount Lemmon Survey || NYS || align=right data-sort-value="0.65" | 650 m || 
|-id=558 bgcolor=#d6d6d6
| 377558 ||  || — || May 11, 2005 || Mount Lemmon || Mount Lemmon Survey || URS || align=right | 3.8 km || 
|-id=559 bgcolor=#d6d6d6
| 377559 ||  || — || May 10, 2005 || Kitt Peak || Spacewatch || — || align=right | 4.2 km || 
|-id=560 bgcolor=#d6d6d6
| 377560 ||  || — || May 10, 2005 || Kitt Peak || Spacewatch || — || align=right | 3.3 km || 
|-id=561 bgcolor=#fefefe
| 377561 ||  || — || May 12, 2005 || Socorro || LINEAR || — || align=right | 1.0 km || 
|-id=562 bgcolor=#d6d6d6
| 377562 ||  || — || May 13, 2005 || Kitt Peak || Spacewatch || — || align=right | 3.2 km || 
|-id=563 bgcolor=#d6d6d6
| 377563 ||  || — || May 14, 2005 || Socorro || LINEAR || MEL || align=right | 4.2 km || 
|-id=564 bgcolor=#fefefe
| 377564 ||  || — || May 3, 2005 || Kitt Peak || Spacewatch || — || align=right data-sort-value="0.71" | 710 m || 
|-id=565 bgcolor=#d6d6d6
| 377565 ||  || — || May 4, 2005 || Mount Lemmon || Mount Lemmon Survey || — || align=right | 5.0 km || 
|-id=566 bgcolor=#d6d6d6
| 377566 ||  || — || May 20, 2005 || Mount Lemmon || Mount Lemmon Survey || TIR || align=right | 3.9 km || 
|-id=567 bgcolor=#d6d6d6
| 377567 ||  || — || June 1, 2005 || Kitt Peak || Spacewatch || — || align=right | 3.8 km || 
|-id=568 bgcolor=#fefefe
| 377568 ||  || — || May 12, 2005 || Socorro || LINEAR || — || align=right data-sort-value="0.76" | 760 m || 
|-id=569 bgcolor=#fefefe
| 377569 ||  || — || May 15, 2005 || Mount Lemmon || Mount Lemmon Survey || — || align=right data-sort-value="0.79" | 790 m || 
|-id=570 bgcolor=#d6d6d6
| 377570 ||  || — || June 8, 2005 || Kitt Peak || Spacewatch || EOS || align=right | 2.6 km || 
|-id=571 bgcolor=#fefefe
| 377571 ||  || — || June 4, 2005 || Kitt Peak || Spacewatch || FLO || align=right data-sort-value="0.80" | 800 m || 
|-id=572 bgcolor=#fefefe
| 377572 ||  || — || June 9, 2005 || Kitt Peak || Spacewatch || PHO || align=right | 1.5 km || 
|-id=573 bgcolor=#fefefe
| 377573 ||  || — || June 8, 2005 || Kitt Peak || Spacewatch || — || align=right data-sort-value="0.74" | 740 m || 
|-id=574 bgcolor=#fefefe
| 377574 ||  || — || June 9, 2005 || Kitt Peak || Spacewatch || FLO || align=right data-sort-value="0.64" | 640 m || 
|-id=575 bgcolor=#fefefe
| 377575 ||  || — || June 15, 2005 || Mount Lemmon || Mount Lemmon Survey || — || align=right | 1.1 km || 
|-id=576 bgcolor=#fefefe
| 377576 ||  || — || July 2, 2005 || Kitt Peak || Spacewatch || EUT || align=right data-sort-value="0.76" | 760 m || 
|-id=577 bgcolor=#fefefe
| 377577 ||  || — || July 3, 2005 || Mount Lemmon || Mount Lemmon Survey || NYS || align=right data-sort-value="0.62" | 620 m || 
|-id=578 bgcolor=#fefefe
| 377578 ||  || — || July 1, 2005 || Kitt Peak || Spacewatch || — || align=right data-sort-value="0.85" | 850 m || 
|-id=579 bgcolor=#fefefe
| 377579 ||  || — || July 5, 2005 || Palomar || NEAT || NYS || align=right data-sort-value="0.77" | 770 m || 
|-id=580 bgcolor=#fefefe
| 377580 ||  || — || July 5, 2005 || Kitt Peak || Spacewatch || NYS || align=right data-sort-value="0.74" | 740 m || 
|-id=581 bgcolor=#fefefe
| 377581 ||  || — || July 5, 2005 || Kitt Peak || Spacewatch || MAS || align=right data-sort-value="0.75" | 750 m || 
|-id=582 bgcolor=#fefefe
| 377582 ||  || — || July 5, 2005 || Kitt Peak || Spacewatch || — || align=right | 1.0 km || 
|-id=583 bgcolor=#fefefe
| 377583 ||  || — || July 4, 2005 || Mount Lemmon || Mount Lemmon Survey || MAS || align=right data-sort-value="0.68" | 680 m || 
|-id=584 bgcolor=#fefefe
| 377584 ||  || — || July 5, 2005 || Palomar || NEAT || NYS || align=right data-sort-value="0.56" | 560 m || 
|-id=585 bgcolor=#fefefe
| 377585 ||  || — || June 17, 2005 || Mount Lemmon || Mount Lemmon Survey || MAS || align=right data-sort-value="0.69" | 690 m || 
|-id=586 bgcolor=#fefefe
| 377586 ||  || — || July 3, 2005 || Mount Lemmon || Mount Lemmon Survey || — || align=right data-sort-value="0.83" | 830 m || 
|-id=587 bgcolor=#fefefe
| 377587 ||  || — || July 3, 2005 || Mount Lemmon || Mount Lemmon Survey || NYS || align=right data-sort-value="0.58" | 580 m || 
|-id=588 bgcolor=#fefefe
| 377588 ||  || — || July 3, 2005 || Mount Lemmon || Mount Lemmon Survey || NYS || align=right data-sort-value="0.65" | 650 m || 
|-id=589 bgcolor=#fefefe
| 377589 ||  || — || July 4, 2005 || Kitt Peak || Spacewatch || V || align=right data-sort-value="0.61" | 610 m || 
|-id=590 bgcolor=#fefefe
| 377590 ||  || — || July 15, 2005 || Mount Lemmon || Mount Lemmon Survey || — || align=right data-sort-value="0.82" | 820 m || 
|-id=591 bgcolor=#fefefe
| 377591 ||  || — || July 28, 2005 || Palomar || NEAT || CIM || align=right | 2.4 km || 
|-id=592 bgcolor=#fefefe
| 377592 ||  || — || July 29, 2005 || Palomar || NEAT || NYS || align=right data-sort-value="0.85" | 850 m || 
|-id=593 bgcolor=#fefefe
| 377593 ||  || — || August 27, 2005 || Kitt Peak || Spacewatch || — || align=right | 1.8 km || 
|-id=594 bgcolor=#fefefe
| 377594 ||  || — || August 26, 2005 || Palomar || NEAT || — || align=right data-sort-value="0.77" | 770 m || 
|-id=595 bgcolor=#fefefe
| 377595 ||  || — || August 28, 2005 || Kitt Peak || Spacewatch || NYS || align=right data-sort-value="0.86" | 860 m || 
|-id=596 bgcolor=#fefefe
| 377596 ||  || — || August 26, 2005 || Siding Spring || SSS || PHO || align=right | 1.8 km || 
|-id=597 bgcolor=#d6d6d6
| 377597 ||  || — || August 26, 2005 || Anderson Mesa || LONEOS || HIL || align=right | 6.0 km || 
|-id=598 bgcolor=#fefefe
| 377598 ||  || — || August 28, 2005 || Kitt Peak || Spacewatch || — || align=right data-sort-value="0.83" | 830 m || 
|-id=599 bgcolor=#fefefe
| 377599 ||  || — || August 28, 2005 || Kitt Peak || Spacewatch || — || align=right data-sort-value="0.63" | 630 m || 
|-id=600 bgcolor=#fefefe
| 377600 ||  || — || August 26, 2005 || Palomar || NEAT || — || align=right | 1.2 km || 
|}

377601–377700 

|-bgcolor=#fefefe
| 377601 ||  || — || August 26, 2005 || Palomar || NEAT || — || align=right | 1.2 km || 
|-id=602 bgcolor=#fefefe
| 377602 ||  || — || August 26, 2005 || Palomar || NEAT || — || align=right | 1.00 km || 
|-id=603 bgcolor=#FA8072
| 377603 ||  || — || August 28, 2005 || Kitt Peak || Spacewatch || — || align=right data-sort-value="0.59" | 590 m || 
|-id=604 bgcolor=#fefefe
| 377604 ||  || — || August 31, 2005 || Palomar || NEAT || — || align=right data-sort-value="0.96" | 960 m || 
|-id=605 bgcolor=#fefefe
| 377605 ||  || — || August 29, 2005 || Palomar || NEAT || — || align=right | 1.4 km || 
|-id=606 bgcolor=#fefefe
| 377606 ||  || — || September 3, 2005 || Palomar || NEAT || H || align=right data-sort-value="0.80" | 800 m || 
|-id=607 bgcolor=#fefefe
| 377607 ||  || — || September 11, 2005 || Socorro || LINEAR || — || align=right | 3.4 km || 
|-id=608 bgcolor=#FA8072
| 377608 ||  || — || September 14, 2005 || Catalina || CSS || critical || align=right data-sort-value="0.56" | 560 m || 
|-id=609 bgcolor=#fefefe
| 377609 ||  || — || September 14, 2005 || Kitt Peak || Spacewatch || — || align=right data-sort-value="0.91" | 910 m || 
|-id=610 bgcolor=#E9E9E9
| 377610 ||  || — || September 1, 2005 || Kitt Peak || Spacewatch || — || align=right data-sort-value="0.69" | 690 m || 
|-id=611 bgcolor=#fefefe
| 377611 ||  || — || September 24, 2005 || Kitt Peak || Spacewatch || H || align=right data-sort-value="0.54" | 540 m || 
|-id=612 bgcolor=#fefefe
| 377612 ||  || — || September 25, 2005 || Catalina || CSS || H || align=right data-sort-value="0.63" | 630 m || 
|-id=613 bgcolor=#fefefe
| 377613 ||  || — || September 23, 2005 || Kitt Peak || Spacewatch || V || align=right data-sort-value="0.76" | 760 m || 
|-id=614 bgcolor=#E9E9E9
| 377614 ||  || — || September 24, 2005 || Kitt Peak || Spacewatch || — || align=right data-sort-value="0.78" | 780 m || 
|-id=615 bgcolor=#E9E9E9
| 377615 ||  || — || September 25, 2005 || Kitt Peak || Spacewatch || MAR || align=right data-sort-value="0.88" | 880 m || 
|-id=616 bgcolor=#fefefe
| 377616 ||  || — || September 28, 2005 || Palomar || NEAT || — || align=right | 1.6 km || 
|-id=617 bgcolor=#fefefe
| 377617 ||  || — || September 24, 2005 || Kitt Peak || Spacewatch || MAS || align=right data-sort-value="0.68" | 680 m || 
|-id=618 bgcolor=#d6d6d6
| 377618 ||  || — || September 25, 2005 || Kitt Peak || Spacewatch || — || align=right | 2.5 km || 
|-id=619 bgcolor=#fefefe
| 377619 ||  || — || September 27, 2005 || Kitt Peak || Spacewatch || — || align=right data-sort-value="0.84" | 840 m || 
|-id=620 bgcolor=#d6d6d6
| 377620 ||  || — || September 29, 2005 || Kitt Peak || Spacewatch || HIL3:2 || align=right | 6.4 km || 
|-id=621 bgcolor=#E9E9E9
| 377621 ||  || — || September 26, 2005 || Kitt Peak || Spacewatch || MAR || align=right data-sort-value="0.79" | 790 m || 
|-id=622 bgcolor=#E9E9E9
| 377622 ||  || — || September 29, 2005 || Kitt Peak || Spacewatch || — || align=right data-sort-value="0.83" | 830 m || 
|-id=623 bgcolor=#fefefe
| 377623 ||  || — || September 30, 2005 || Mount Lemmon || Mount Lemmon Survey || NYS || align=right data-sort-value="0.64" | 640 m || 
|-id=624 bgcolor=#fefefe
| 377624 ||  || — || September 30, 2005 || Anderson Mesa || LONEOS || — || align=right | 1.3 km || 
|-id=625 bgcolor=#E9E9E9
| 377625 ||  || — || September 29, 2005 || Mount Lemmon || Mount Lemmon Survey || — || align=right data-sort-value="0.93" | 930 m || 
|-id=626 bgcolor=#d6d6d6
| 377626 ||  || — || August 31, 2005 || Kitt Peak || Spacewatch || 3:2 || align=right | 4.9 km || 
|-id=627 bgcolor=#fefefe
| 377627 ||  || — || September 30, 2005 || Mount Lemmon || Mount Lemmon Survey || V || align=right data-sort-value="0.49" | 490 m || 
|-id=628 bgcolor=#d6d6d6
| 377628 ||  || — || September 24, 2005 || Palomar || NEAT || — || align=right | 2.7 km || 
|-id=629 bgcolor=#E9E9E9
| 377629 ||  || — || September 29, 2005 || Kitt Peak || Spacewatch || ADE || align=right | 1.7 km || 
|-id=630 bgcolor=#E9E9E9
| 377630 ||  || — || September 29, 2005 || Mount Lemmon || Mount Lemmon Survey || — || align=right data-sort-value="0.78" | 780 m || 
|-id=631 bgcolor=#E9E9E9
| 377631 ||  || — || October 1, 2005 || Kitt Peak || Spacewatch || — || align=right data-sort-value="0.78" | 780 m || 
|-id=632 bgcolor=#d6d6d6
| 377632 ||  || — || October 1, 2005 || Mount Lemmon || Mount Lemmon Survey || — || align=right | 2.5 km || 
|-id=633 bgcolor=#fefefe
| 377633 ||  || — || October 12, 2005 || Altschwendt || W. Ries || H || align=right data-sort-value="0.80" | 800 m || 
|-id=634 bgcolor=#fefefe
| 377634 ||  || — || October 10, 2005 || Catalina || CSS || H || align=right data-sort-value="0.76" | 760 m || 
|-id=635 bgcolor=#E9E9E9
| 377635 ||  || — || October 1, 2005 || Mount Lemmon || Mount Lemmon Survey || — || align=right data-sort-value="0.92" | 920 m || 
|-id=636 bgcolor=#fefefe
| 377636 ||  || — || October 4, 2005 || Mount Lemmon || Mount Lemmon Survey || — || align=right data-sort-value="0.98" | 980 m || 
|-id=637 bgcolor=#fefefe
| 377637 ||  || — || October 3, 2005 || Catalina || CSS || — || align=right | 2.4 km || 
|-id=638 bgcolor=#fefefe
| 377638 ||  || — || October 6, 2005 || Kitt Peak || Spacewatch || — || align=right data-sort-value="0.97" | 970 m || 
|-id=639 bgcolor=#E9E9E9
| 377639 ||  || — || October 7, 2005 || Mount Lemmon || Mount Lemmon Survey || — || align=right data-sort-value="0.87" | 870 m || 
|-id=640 bgcolor=#E9E9E9
| 377640 ||  || — || October 7, 2005 || Kitt Peak || Spacewatch || — || align=right data-sort-value="0.71" | 710 m || 
|-id=641 bgcolor=#E9E9E9
| 377641 ||  || — || October 25, 2005 || Catalina || CSS || — || align=right | 2.1 km || 
|-id=642 bgcolor=#E9E9E9
| 377642 ||  || — || October 22, 2005 || Kitt Peak || Spacewatch || — || align=right data-sort-value="0.75" | 750 m || 
|-id=643 bgcolor=#E9E9E9
| 377643 ||  || — || October 22, 2005 || Kitt Peak || Spacewatch || — || align=right | 1.0 km || 
|-id=644 bgcolor=#E9E9E9
| 377644 ||  || — || October 22, 2005 || Kitt Peak || Spacewatch || — || align=right data-sort-value="0.96" | 960 m || 
|-id=645 bgcolor=#E9E9E9
| 377645 ||  || — || October 22, 2005 || Kitt Peak || Spacewatch || — || align=right | 1.0 km || 
|-id=646 bgcolor=#E9E9E9
| 377646 ||  || — || October 22, 2005 || Kitt Peak || Spacewatch || — || align=right data-sort-value="0.84" | 840 m || 
|-id=647 bgcolor=#d6d6d6
| 377647 ||  || — || October 24, 2005 || Kitt Peak || Spacewatch || 3:2 || align=right | 3.9 km || 
|-id=648 bgcolor=#d6d6d6
| 377648 ||  || — || October 25, 2005 || Kitt Peak || Spacewatch || HIL3:2 || align=right | 7.1 km || 
|-id=649 bgcolor=#E9E9E9
| 377649 ||  || — || October 25, 2005 || Mount Lemmon || Mount Lemmon Survey || — || align=right data-sort-value="0.64" | 640 m || 
|-id=650 bgcolor=#fefefe
| 377650 ||  || — || October 25, 2005 || Mount Lemmon || Mount Lemmon Survey || — || align=right data-sort-value="0.75" | 750 m || 
|-id=651 bgcolor=#E9E9E9
| 377651 ||  || — || October 25, 2005 || Kitt Peak || Spacewatch || — || align=right data-sort-value="0.78" | 780 m || 
|-id=652 bgcolor=#E9E9E9
| 377652 ||  || — || October 26, 2005 || Kitt Peak || Spacewatch || — || align=right | 1.8 km || 
|-id=653 bgcolor=#E9E9E9
| 377653 ||  || — || October 26, 2005 || Kitt Peak || Spacewatch || BRU || align=right | 3.5 km || 
|-id=654 bgcolor=#d6d6d6
| 377654 ||  || — || October 24, 2005 || Kitt Peak || Spacewatch || SHU3:2 || align=right | 4.8 km || 
|-id=655 bgcolor=#E9E9E9
| 377655 ||  || — || October 24, 2005 || Kitt Peak || Spacewatch || — || align=right data-sort-value="0.80" | 800 m || 
|-id=656 bgcolor=#E9E9E9
| 377656 ||  || — || October 24, 2005 || Kitt Peak || Spacewatch || — || align=right | 1.7 km || 
|-id=657 bgcolor=#E9E9E9
| 377657 ||  || — || October 25, 2005 || Kitt Peak || Spacewatch || — || align=right data-sort-value="0.96" | 960 m || 
|-id=658 bgcolor=#E9E9E9
| 377658 ||  || — || October 25, 2005 || Kitt Peak || Spacewatch || — || align=right data-sort-value="0.75" | 750 m || 
|-id=659 bgcolor=#E9E9E9
| 377659 ||  || — || October 25, 2005 || Kitt Peak || Spacewatch || — || align=right | 1.6 km || 
|-id=660 bgcolor=#E9E9E9
| 377660 ||  || — || October 25, 2005 || Kitt Peak || Spacewatch || — || align=right | 1.0 km || 
|-id=661 bgcolor=#d6d6d6
| 377661 ||  || — || October 25, 2005 || Kitt Peak || Spacewatch || 3:2 || align=right | 5.0 km || 
|-id=662 bgcolor=#fefefe
| 377662 ||  || — || October 25, 2005 || Mount Lemmon || Mount Lemmon Survey || V || align=right data-sort-value="0.89" | 890 m || 
|-id=663 bgcolor=#E9E9E9
| 377663 ||  || — || October 25, 2005 || Kitt Peak || Spacewatch || — || align=right | 1.9 km || 
|-id=664 bgcolor=#E9E9E9
| 377664 ||  || — || October 26, 2005 || Kitt Peak || Spacewatch || — || align=right | 1.9 km || 
|-id=665 bgcolor=#d6d6d6
| 377665 ||  || — || October 22, 2005 || Catalina || CSS || 3:2 || align=right | 5.6 km || 
|-id=666 bgcolor=#fefefe
| 377666 ||  || — || October 25, 2005 || Kitt Peak || Spacewatch || — || align=right data-sort-value="0.53" | 530 m || 
|-id=667 bgcolor=#fefefe
| 377667 ||  || — || October 28, 2005 || Socorro || LINEAR || H || align=right data-sort-value="0.79" | 790 m || 
|-id=668 bgcolor=#fefefe
| 377668 ||  || — || October 24, 2005 || Palomar || NEAT || H || align=right data-sort-value="0.70" | 700 m || 
|-id=669 bgcolor=#E9E9E9
| 377669 ||  || — || October 26, 2005 || Kitt Peak || Spacewatch || — || align=right | 1.4 km || 
|-id=670 bgcolor=#E9E9E9
| 377670 ||  || — || October 26, 2005 || Kitt Peak || Spacewatch || — || align=right | 1.2 km || 
|-id=671 bgcolor=#E9E9E9
| 377671 ||  || — || October 26, 2005 || Kitt Peak || Spacewatch || — || align=right data-sort-value="0.77" | 770 m || 
|-id=672 bgcolor=#E9E9E9
| 377672 ||  || — || October 29, 2005 || Catalina || CSS || — || align=right | 1.1 km || 
|-id=673 bgcolor=#fefefe
| 377673 ||  || — || October 24, 2005 || Kitt Peak || Spacewatch || — || align=right data-sort-value="0.81" | 810 m || 
|-id=674 bgcolor=#E9E9E9
| 377674 ||  || — || October 27, 2005 || Kitt Peak || Spacewatch || — || align=right | 1.0 km || 
|-id=675 bgcolor=#d6d6d6
| 377675 ||  || — || October 30, 2005 || Mount Lemmon || Mount Lemmon Survey || SHU3:2 || align=right | 5.0 km || 
|-id=676 bgcolor=#E9E9E9
| 377676 ||  || — || October 27, 2005 || Kitt Peak || Spacewatch || — || align=right | 1.1 km || 
|-id=677 bgcolor=#E9E9E9
| 377677 ||  || — || October 29, 2005 || Mount Lemmon || Mount Lemmon Survey || — || align=right data-sort-value="0.89" | 890 m || 
|-id=678 bgcolor=#d6d6d6
| 377678 ||  || — || October 28, 2005 || Kitt Peak || Spacewatch || HIL3:2 || align=right | 5.4 km || 
|-id=679 bgcolor=#E9E9E9
| 377679 ||  || — || October 28, 2005 || Kitt Peak || Spacewatch || — || align=right data-sort-value="0.75" | 750 m || 
|-id=680 bgcolor=#E9E9E9
| 377680 ||  || — || October 29, 2005 || Catalina || CSS || — || align=right | 3.8 km || 
|-id=681 bgcolor=#E9E9E9
| 377681 ||  || — || October 29, 2005 || Mount Lemmon || Mount Lemmon Survey || — || align=right | 1.5 km || 
|-id=682 bgcolor=#E9E9E9
| 377682 || 2005 VJ || — || November 2, 2005 || Lulin Observatory || Lulin Obs. || — || align=right data-sort-value="0.88" | 880 m || 
|-id=683 bgcolor=#E9E9E9
| 377683 ||  || — || November 4, 2005 || Kitt Peak || Spacewatch || — || align=right data-sort-value="0.89" | 890 m || 
|-id=684 bgcolor=#E9E9E9
| 377684 ||  || — || November 4, 2005 || Kitt Peak || Spacewatch || — || align=right | 1.9 km || 
|-id=685 bgcolor=#E9E9E9
| 377685 ||  || — || November 4, 2005 || Mount Lemmon || Mount Lemmon Survey || — || align=right | 1.0 km || 
|-id=686 bgcolor=#E9E9E9
| 377686 ||  || — || November 4, 2005 || Kitt Peak || Spacewatch || — || align=right data-sort-value="0.90" | 900 m || 
|-id=687 bgcolor=#E9E9E9
| 377687 ||  || — || November 1, 2005 || Mount Lemmon || Mount Lemmon Survey || KON || align=right | 2.3 km || 
|-id=688 bgcolor=#E9E9E9
| 377688 ||  || — || November 1, 2005 || Mount Lemmon || Mount Lemmon Survey || JUL || align=right data-sort-value="0.99" | 990 m || 
|-id=689 bgcolor=#E9E9E9
| 377689 ||  || — || November 6, 2005 || Mount Lemmon || Mount Lemmon Survey || — || align=right | 1.7 km || 
|-id=690 bgcolor=#E9E9E9
| 377690 ||  || — || November 5, 2005 || Kitt Peak || Spacewatch || — || align=right | 1.3 km || 
|-id=691 bgcolor=#E9E9E9
| 377691 ||  || — || November 5, 2005 || Kitt Peak || Spacewatch || — || align=right data-sort-value="0.93" | 930 m || 
|-id=692 bgcolor=#E9E9E9
| 377692 ||  || — || November 9, 2005 || Campo Imperatore || CINEOS || — || align=right | 1.4 km || 
|-id=693 bgcolor=#fefefe
| 377693 ||  || — || November 4, 2005 || Mount Lemmon || Mount Lemmon Survey || — || align=right data-sort-value="0.91" | 910 m || 
|-id=694 bgcolor=#E9E9E9
| 377694 ||  || — || November 6, 2005 || Mount Lemmon || Mount Lemmon Survey || — || align=right | 2.2 km || 
|-id=695 bgcolor=#E9E9E9
| 377695 ||  || — || November 1, 2005 || Kitt Peak || Spacewatch || — || align=right | 1.1 km || 
|-id=696 bgcolor=#fefefe
| 377696 ||  || — || November 21, 2005 || Palomar || NEAT || H || align=right data-sort-value="0.78" | 780 m || 
|-id=697 bgcolor=#fefefe
| 377697 ||  || — || November 21, 2005 || Socorro || LINEAR || H || align=right data-sort-value="0.70" | 700 m || 
|-id=698 bgcolor=#E9E9E9
| 377698 ||  || — || October 31, 2005 || Kitt Peak || Spacewatch || — || align=right | 1.0 km || 
|-id=699 bgcolor=#E9E9E9
| 377699 ||  || — || November 22, 2005 || Kitt Peak || Spacewatch || — || align=right | 2.5 km || 
|-id=700 bgcolor=#E9E9E9
| 377700 ||  || — || November 22, 2005 || Kitt Peak || Spacewatch || — || align=right | 1.3 km || 
|}

377701–377800 

|-bgcolor=#E9E9E9
| 377701 ||  || — || November 21, 2005 || Kitt Peak || Spacewatch || — || align=right data-sort-value="0.83" | 830 m || 
|-id=702 bgcolor=#E9E9E9
| 377702 ||  || — || November 21, 2005 || Kitt Peak || Spacewatch || — || align=right | 1.2 km || 
|-id=703 bgcolor=#E9E9E9
| 377703 ||  || — || November 21, 2005 || Kitt Peak || Spacewatch || — || align=right | 1.2 km || 
|-id=704 bgcolor=#E9E9E9
| 377704 ||  || — || November 21, 2005 || Kitt Peak || Spacewatch || — || align=right | 1.3 km || 
|-id=705 bgcolor=#E9E9E9
| 377705 ||  || — || November 21, 2005 || Kitt Peak || Spacewatch || EUN || align=right | 1.6 km || 
|-id=706 bgcolor=#E9E9E9
| 377706 ||  || — || November 21, 2005 || Kitt Peak || Spacewatch || — || align=right | 2.5 km || 
|-id=707 bgcolor=#fefefe
| 377707 ||  || — || November 25, 2005 || Kitt Peak || Spacewatch || H || align=right data-sort-value="0.69" | 690 m || 
|-id=708 bgcolor=#E9E9E9
| 377708 ||  || — || November 29, 2005 || Junk Bond || D. Healy || — || align=right data-sort-value="0.92" | 920 m || 
|-id=709 bgcolor=#E9E9E9
| 377709 ||  || — || November 25, 2005 || Kitt Peak || Spacewatch || — || align=right | 1.3 km || 
|-id=710 bgcolor=#fefefe
| 377710 ||  || — || November 25, 2005 || Mount Lemmon || Mount Lemmon Survey || H || align=right data-sort-value="0.62" | 620 m || 
|-id=711 bgcolor=#E9E9E9
| 377711 ||  || — || November 22, 2005 || Kitt Peak || Spacewatch || — || align=right | 1.8 km || 
|-id=712 bgcolor=#E9E9E9
| 377712 ||  || — || November 26, 2005 || Kitt Peak || Spacewatch || — || align=right data-sort-value="0.97" | 970 m || 
|-id=713 bgcolor=#E9E9E9
| 377713 ||  || — || November 28, 2005 || Mount Lemmon || Mount Lemmon Survey || — || align=right | 1.7 km || 
|-id=714 bgcolor=#E9E9E9
| 377714 ||  || — || November 29, 2005 || Mount Lemmon || Mount Lemmon Survey || — || align=right data-sort-value="0.86" | 860 m || 
|-id=715 bgcolor=#E9E9E9
| 377715 ||  || — || November 29, 2005 || Socorro || LINEAR || — || align=right | 2.0 km || 
|-id=716 bgcolor=#E9E9E9
| 377716 ||  || — || November 30, 2005 || Kitt Peak || Spacewatch || — || align=right | 1.0 km || 
|-id=717 bgcolor=#E9E9E9
| 377717 ||  || — || November 30, 2005 || Kitt Peak || Spacewatch || — || align=right | 1.3 km || 
|-id=718 bgcolor=#E9E9E9
| 377718 ||  || — || November 29, 2005 || Socorro || LINEAR || HNS || align=right | 1.4 km || 
|-id=719 bgcolor=#E9E9E9
| 377719 ||  || — || November 30, 2005 || Mount Lemmon || Mount Lemmon Survey || — || align=right | 3.9 km || 
|-id=720 bgcolor=#E9E9E9
| 377720 ||  || — || November 4, 2005 || Kitt Peak || Spacewatch || — || align=right | 1.8 km || 
|-id=721 bgcolor=#E9E9E9
| 377721 ||  || — || November 30, 2005 || Kitt Peak || Spacewatch || — || align=right | 1.1 km || 
|-id=722 bgcolor=#E9E9E9
| 377722 ||  || — || November 26, 2005 || Socorro || LINEAR || — || align=right | 2.2 km || 
|-id=723 bgcolor=#d6d6d6
| 377723 ||  || — || November 28, 2005 || Socorro || LINEAR || 3:2 || align=right | 5.3 km || 
|-id=724 bgcolor=#E9E9E9
| 377724 ||  || — || November 28, 2005 || Mount Lemmon || Mount Lemmon Survey || — || align=right data-sort-value="0.99" | 990 m || 
|-id=725 bgcolor=#E9E9E9
| 377725 ||  || — || November 30, 2005 || Kitt Peak || Spacewatch || — || align=right | 1.3 km || 
|-id=726 bgcolor=#E9E9E9
| 377726 ||  || — || November 21, 2005 || Catalina || CSS || KON || align=right | 3.1 km || 
|-id=727 bgcolor=#fefefe
| 377727 ||  || — || November 22, 2005 || Catalina || CSS || H || align=right data-sort-value="0.58" | 580 m || 
|-id=728 bgcolor=#E9E9E9
| 377728 ||  || — || November 28, 2005 || Socorro || LINEAR || — || align=right | 1.3 km || 
|-id=729 bgcolor=#E9E9E9
| 377729 ||  || — || November 30, 2005 || Kitt Peak || Spacewatch || — || align=right data-sort-value="0.95" | 950 m || 
|-id=730 bgcolor=#fefefe
| 377730 ||  || — || December 2, 2005 || Socorro || LINEAR || H || align=right data-sort-value="0.93" | 930 m || 
|-id=731 bgcolor=#E9E9E9
| 377731 ||  || — || December 1, 2005 || Socorro || LINEAR || — || align=right data-sort-value="0.98" | 980 m || 
|-id=732 bgcolor=#FFC2E0
| 377732 ||  || — || December 4, 2005 || Catalina || CSS || APO +1kmPHA || align=right data-sort-value="0.99" | 990 m || 
|-id=733 bgcolor=#E9E9E9
| 377733 ||  || — || November 22, 2005 || Kitt Peak || Spacewatch || — || align=right data-sort-value="0.82" | 820 m || 
|-id=734 bgcolor=#E9E9E9
| 377734 ||  || — || December 2, 2005 || Kitt Peak || Spacewatch || — || align=right | 1.7 km || 
|-id=735 bgcolor=#E9E9E9
| 377735 ||  || — || December 2, 2005 || Kitt Peak || Spacewatch || — || align=right | 2.1 km || 
|-id=736 bgcolor=#E9E9E9
| 377736 ||  || — || December 2, 2005 || Socorro || LINEAR || — || align=right | 1.3 km || 
|-id=737 bgcolor=#E9E9E9
| 377737 ||  || — || December 4, 2005 || Socorro || LINEAR || — || align=right | 1.3 km || 
|-id=738 bgcolor=#E9E9E9
| 377738 ||  || — || December 2, 2005 || Socorro || LINEAR || — || align=right | 3.1 km || 
|-id=739 bgcolor=#E9E9E9
| 377739 ||  || — || November 22, 2005 || Kitt Peak || Spacewatch || — || align=right | 1.1 km || 
|-id=740 bgcolor=#E9E9E9
| 377740 ||  || — || December 4, 2005 || Kitt Peak || Spacewatch || — || align=right | 1.5 km || 
|-id=741 bgcolor=#E9E9E9
| 377741 ||  || — || December 2, 2005 || Kitt Peak || Spacewatch || — || align=right | 2.3 km || 
|-id=742 bgcolor=#E9E9E9
| 377742 ||  || — || December 4, 2005 || Mount Lemmon || Mount Lemmon Survey || — || align=right data-sort-value="0.95" | 950 m || 
|-id=743 bgcolor=#E9E9E9
| 377743 ||  || — || December 5, 2005 || Kitt Peak || Spacewatch || HNS || align=right | 1.5 km || 
|-id=744 bgcolor=#E9E9E9
| 377744 ||  || — || December 6, 2005 || Kitt Peak || Spacewatch || — || align=right | 1.2 km || 
|-id=745 bgcolor=#E9E9E9
| 377745 ||  || — || December 10, 2005 || Catalina || CSS || — || align=right | 1.5 km || 
|-id=746 bgcolor=#E9E9E9
| 377746 ||  || — || December 7, 2005 || Kitt Peak || Spacewatch || — || align=right | 1.5 km || 
|-id=747 bgcolor=#E9E9E9
| 377747 ||  || — || December 1, 2005 || Kitt Peak || M. W. Buie || HEN || align=right data-sort-value="0.98" | 980 m || 
|-id=748 bgcolor=#E9E9E9
| 377748 ||  || — || December 5, 2005 || Mount Lemmon || Mount Lemmon Survey || — || align=right | 2.4 km || 
|-id=749 bgcolor=#E9E9E9
| 377749 ||  || — || December 21, 2005 || Kitt Peak || Spacewatch || — || align=right | 1.1 km || 
|-id=750 bgcolor=#E9E9E9
| 377750 ||  || — || December 22, 2005 || Kitt Peak || Spacewatch || — || align=right data-sort-value="0.80" | 800 m || 
|-id=751 bgcolor=#E9E9E9
| 377751 ||  || — || December 22, 2005 || Kitt Peak || Spacewatch || — || align=right | 1.5 km || 
|-id=752 bgcolor=#E9E9E9
| 377752 ||  || — || December 22, 2005 || Kitt Peak || Spacewatch || — || align=right | 3.0 km || 
|-id=753 bgcolor=#E9E9E9
| 377753 ||  || — || December 22, 2005 || Kitt Peak || Spacewatch || — || align=right | 1.3 km || 
|-id=754 bgcolor=#E9E9E9
| 377754 ||  || — || December 22, 2005 || Kitt Peak || Spacewatch || — || align=right data-sort-value="0.99" | 990 m || 
|-id=755 bgcolor=#E9E9E9
| 377755 ||  || — || December 24, 2005 || Kitt Peak || Spacewatch || — || align=right | 1.0 km || 
|-id=756 bgcolor=#E9E9E9
| 377756 ||  || — || December 22, 2005 || Kitt Peak || Spacewatch || — || align=right | 1.3 km || 
|-id=757 bgcolor=#E9E9E9
| 377757 ||  || — || December 24, 2005 || Kitt Peak || Spacewatch || — || align=right data-sort-value="0.94" | 940 m || 
|-id=758 bgcolor=#E9E9E9
| 377758 ||  || — || December 26, 2005 || Catalina || CSS || — || align=right | 1.3 km || 
|-id=759 bgcolor=#E9E9E9
| 377759 ||  || — || December 22, 2005 || Kitt Peak || Spacewatch || — || align=right | 1.5 km || 
|-id=760 bgcolor=#E9E9E9
| 377760 ||  || — || December 25, 2005 || Kitt Peak || Spacewatch || — || align=right data-sort-value="0.94" | 940 m || 
|-id=761 bgcolor=#E9E9E9
| 377761 ||  || — || December 22, 2005 || Kitt Peak || Spacewatch || — || align=right | 1.4 km || 
|-id=762 bgcolor=#d6d6d6
| 377762 ||  || — || December 22, 2005 || Kitt Peak || Spacewatch || 3:2 || align=right | 4.0 km || 
|-id=763 bgcolor=#E9E9E9
| 377763 ||  || — || December 26, 2005 || Kitt Peak || Spacewatch || PAD || align=right | 2.1 km || 
|-id=764 bgcolor=#E9E9E9
| 377764 ||  || — || December 24, 2005 || Kitt Peak || Spacewatch || — || align=right | 1.3 km || 
|-id=765 bgcolor=#E9E9E9
| 377765 ||  || — || December 21, 2005 || Junk Bond || D. Healy || — || align=right | 1.3 km || 
|-id=766 bgcolor=#E9E9E9
| 377766 ||  || — || December 25, 2005 || Kitt Peak || Spacewatch || HEN || align=right | 2.8 km || 
|-id=767 bgcolor=#E9E9E9
| 377767 ||  || — || December 26, 2005 || Mount Lemmon || Mount Lemmon Survey || — || align=right | 1.1 km || 
|-id=768 bgcolor=#E9E9E9
| 377768 ||  || — || December 25, 2005 || Kitt Peak || Spacewatch || — || align=right | 1.5 km || 
|-id=769 bgcolor=#E9E9E9
| 377769 ||  || — || December 24, 2005 || Kitt Peak || Spacewatch || — || align=right | 1.2 km || 
|-id=770 bgcolor=#E9E9E9
| 377770 ||  || — || December 25, 2005 || Mount Lemmon || Mount Lemmon Survey || — || align=right | 1.6 km || 
|-id=771 bgcolor=#E9E9E9
| 377771 ||  || — || December 26, 2005 || Kitt Peak || Spacewatch || — || align=right | 1.5 km || 
|-id=772 bgcolor=#E9E9E9
| 377772 ||  || — || December 27, 2005 || Kitt Peak || Spacewatch || — || align=right | 2.4 km || 
|-id=773 bgcolor=#E9E9E9
| 377773 ||  || — || December 29, 2005 || Kitt Peak || Spacewatch || — || align=right | 1.1 km || 
|-id=774 bgcolor=#E9E9E9
| 377774 ||  || — || December 7, 2005 || Catalina || CSS || — || align=right | 2.3 km || 
|-id=775 bgcolor=#E9E9E9
| 377775 ||  || — || December 25, 2005 || Kitt Peak || Spacewatch || — || align=right | 2.0 km || 
|-id=776 bgcolor=#E9E9E9
| 377776 ||  || — || December 27, 2005 || Kitt Peak || Spacewatch || EUN || align=right | 1.4 km || 
|-id=777 bgcolor=#E9E9E9
| 377777 ||  || — || December 6, 2005 || Mount Lemmon || Mount Lemmon Survey || — || align=right | 2.3 km || 
|-id=778 bgcolor=#E9E9E9
| 377778 ||  || — || December 22, 2005 || Kitt Peak || Spacewatch || — || align=right | 2.9 km || 
|-id=779 bgcolor=#E9E9E9
| 377779 ||  || — || December 25, 2005 || Catalina || CSS || JUN || align=right | 1.6 km || 
|-id=780 bgcolor=#E9E9E9
| 377780 ||  || — || December 30, 2005 || Mount Lemmon || Mount Lemmon Survey || — || align=right | 1.7 km || 
|-id=781 bgcolor=#E9E9E9
| 377781 ||  || — || December 25, 2005 || Kitt Peak || Spacewatch || — || align=right | 1.7 km || 
|-id=782 bgcolor=#E9E9E9
| 377782 ||  || — || December 25, 2005 || Kitt Peak || Spacewatch || — || align=right | 2.3 km || 
|-id=783 bgcolor=#E9E9E9
| 377783 ||  || — || December 28, 2005 || Kitt Peak || Spacewatch || — || align=right | 1.2 km || 
|-id=784 bgcolor=#E9E9E9
| 377784 ||  || — || December 25, 2005 || Kitt Peak || Spacewatch || — || align=right | 1.2 km || 
|-id=785 bgcolor=#E9E9E9
| 377785 ||  || — || December 28, 2005 || Kitt Peak || Spacewatch || — || align=right | 2.1 km || 
|-id=786 bgcolor=#E9E9E9
| 377786 ||  || — || December 29, 2005 || Kitt Peak || Spacewatch || — || align=right | 1.3 km || 
|-id=787 bgcolor=#E9E9E9
| 377787 ||  || — || December 30, 2005 || Anderson Mesa || LONEOS || ADE || align=right | 2.4 km || 
|-id=788 bgcolor=#E9E9E9
| 377788 ||  || — || January 2, 2006 || Mount Lemmon || Mount Lemmon Survey || — || align=right | 1.0 km || 
|-id=789 bgcolor=#FA8072
| 377789 ||  || — || January 4, 2006 || Kitt Peak || Spacewatch || — || align=right | 1.0 km || 
|-id=790 bgcolor=#E9E9E9
| 377790 ||  || — || January 5, 2006 || Mount Lemmon || Mount Lemmon Survey || — || align=right | 2.9 km || 
|-id=791 bgcolor=#E9E9E9
| 377791 ||  || — || January 5, 2006 || Catalina || CSS || — || align=right | 2.2 km || 
|-id=792 bgcolor=#E9E9E9
| 377792 ||  || — || January 5, 2006 || Catalina || CSS || — || align=right | 2.4 km || 
|-id=793 bgcolor=#E9E9E9
| 377793 ||  || — || January 4, 2006 || Catalina || CSS || — || align=right | 1.1 km || 
|-id=794 bgcolor=#E9E9E9
| 377794 ||  || — || January 5, 2006 || Kitt Peak || Spacewatch || — || align=right | 1.3 km || 
|-id=795 bgcolor=#E9E9E9
| 377795 ||  || — || January 5, 2006 || Kitt Peak || Spacewatch || — || align=right | 1.3 km || 
|-id=796 bgcolor=#E9E9E9
| 377796 ||  || — || January 5, 2006 || Catalina || CSS || JUN || align=right | 1.1 km || 
|-id=797 bgcolor=#E9E9E9
| 377797 ||  || — || January 4, 2006 || Mount Lemmon || Mount Lemmon Survey || — || align=right | 1.8 km || 
|-id=798 bgcolor=#E9E9E9
| 377798 ||  || — || January 6, 2006 || Kitt Peak || Spacewatch || MIS || align=right | 2.0 km || 
|-id=799 bgcolor=#E9E9E9
| 377799 ||  || — || January 5, 2006 || Kitt Peak || Spacewatch || — || align=right | 2.0 km || 
|-id=800 bgcolor=#E9E9E9
| 377800 ||  || — || January 8, 2006 || Mount Lemmon || Mount Lemmon Survey || — || align=right | 3.6 km || 
|}

377801–377900 

|-bgcolor=#E9E9E9
| 377801 ||  || — || January 6, 2006 || Kitt Peak || Spacewatch || — || align=right | 1.5 km || 
|-id=802 bgcolor=#E9E9E9
| 377802 ||  || — || January 9, 2006 || Kitt Peak || Spacewatch || — || align=right | 1.4 km || 
|-id=803 bgcolor=#E9E9E9
| 377803 ||  || — || January 9, 2006 || Kitt Peak || Spacewatch || — || align=right data-sort-value="0.87" | 870 m || 
|-id=804 bgcolor=#E9E9E9
| 377804 ||  || — || January 6, 2006 || Kitt Peak || Spacewatch || — || align=right | 1.6 km || 
|-id=805 bgcolor=#E9E9E9
| 377805 ||  || — || January 6, 2006 || Mount Lemmon || Mount Lemmon Survey || — || align=right | 1.7 km || 
|-id=806 bgcolor=#E9E9E9
| 377806 ||  || — || January 6, 2006 || Mount Lemmon || Mount Lemmon Survey || — || align=right | 2.5 km || 
|-id=807 bgcolor=#E9E9E9
| 377807 ||  || — || January 3, 2006 || Socorro || LINEAR || EUN || align=right | 1.6 km || 
|-id=808 bgcolor=#d6d6d6
| 377808 ||  || — || January 8, 2006 || Mount Lemmon || Mount Lemmon Survey || — || align=right | 3.2 km || 
|-id=809 bgcolor=#E9E9E9
| 377809 ||  || — || January 21, 2006 || Kitt Peak || Spacewatch || WIT || align=right | 1.1 km || 
|-id=810 bgcolor=#E9E9E9
| 377810 ||  || — || January 22, 2006 || Anderson Mesa || LONEOS || — || align=right | 1.0 km || 
|-id=811 bgcolor=#E9E9E9
| 377811 ||  || — || January 21, 2006 || Kitt Peak || Spacewatch || JUN || align=right | 1.2 km || 
|-id=812 bgcolor=#E9E9E9
| 377812 ||  || — || January 4, 2006 || Mount Lemmon || Mount Lemmon Survey || — || align=right | 2.1 km || 
|-id=813 bgcolor=#E9E9E9
| 377813 ||  || — || January 22, 2006 || Mount Lemmon || Mount Lemmon Survey || — || align=right | 1.5 km || 
|-id=814 bgcolor=#E9E9E9
| 377814 ||  || — || January 20, 2006 || Kitt Peak || Spacewatch || — || align=right data-sort-value="0.85" | 850 m || 
|-id=815 bgcolor=#E9E9E9
| 377815 ||  || — || January 23, 2006 || Catalina || CSS || — || align=right | 1.8 km || 
|-id=816 bgcolor=#E9E9E9
| 377816 ||  || — || January 25, 2006 || Kitt Peak || Spacewatch || MIS || align=right | 2.0 km || 
|-id=817 bgcolor=#E9E9E9
| 377817 ||  || — || January 23, 2006 || Kitt Peak || Spacewatch || — || align=right | 1.4 km || 
|-id=818 bgcolor=#E9E9E9
| 377818 ||  || — || January 23, 2006 || Kitt Peak || Spacewatch || — || align=right | 2.6 km || 
|-id=819 bgcolor=#E9E9E9
| 377819 ||  || — || January 23, 2006 || Kitt Peak || Spacewatch || HEN || align=right | 1.1 km || 
|-id=820 bgcolor=#E9E9E9
| 377820 ||  || — || January 23, 2006 || Kitt Peak || Spacewatch || WIT || align=right | 1.2 km || 
|-id=821 bgcolor=#E9E9E9
| 377821 ||  || — || March 5, 2002 || Kitt Peak || Spacewatch || — || align=right data-sort-value="0.93" | 930 m || 
|-id=822 bgcolor=#E9E9E9
| 377822 ||  || — || January 25, 2006 || Kitt Peak || Spacewatch || MIS || align=right | 2.5 km || 
|-id=823 bgcolor=#E9E9E9
| 377823 ||  || — || January 25, 2006 || Kitt Peak || Spacewatch || HOF || align=right | 2.9 km || 
|-id=824 bgcolor=#E9E9E9
| 377824 ||  || — || January 26, 2006 || Kitt Peak || Spacewatch || — || align=right | 2.4 km || 
|-id=825 bgcolor=#E9E9E9
| 377825 ||  || — || January 22, 2006 || Catalina || CSS || ADE || align=right | 2.2 km || 
|-id=826 bgcolor=#E9E9E9
| 377826 ||  || — || January 23, 2006 || Kitt Peak || Spacewatch || — || align=right | 1.4 km || 
|-id=827 bgcolor=#E9E9E9
| 377827 ||  || — || January 23, 2006 || Mount Lemmon || Mount Lemmon Survey || — || align=right | 1.8 km || 
|-id=828 bgcolor=#E9E9E9
| 377828 ||  || — || January 24, 2006 || Kitt Peak || Spacewatch || — || align=right | 1.1 km || 
|-id=829 bgcolor=#E9E9E9
| 377829 ||  || — || January 25, 2006 || Kitt Peak || Spacewatch || — || align=right | 3.4 km || 
|-id=830 bgcolor=#E9E9E9
| 377830 ||  || — || January 25, 2006 || Kitt Peak || Spacewatch || — || align=right | 2.4 km || 
|-id=831 bgcolor=#E9E9E9
| 377831 ||  || — || January 25, 2006 || Kitt Peak || Spacewatch || — || align=right | 1.9 km || 
|-id=832 bgcolor=#E9E9E9
| 377832 ||  || — || January 25, 2006 || Kitt Peak || Spacewatch || MIS || align=right | 1.8 km || 
|-id=833 bgcolor=#E9E9E9
| 377833 ||  || — || January 26, 2006 || Kitt Peak || Spacewatch || MRX || align=right | 1.1 km || 
|-id=834 bgcolor=#E9E9E9
| 377834 ||  || — || January 26, 2006 || Kitt Peak || Spacewatch || — || align=right | 3.2 km || 
|-id=835 bgcolor=#E9E9E9
| 377835 ||  || — || January 26, 2006 || Kitt Peak || Spacewatch || MRX || align=right | 1.2 km || 
|-id=836 bgcolor=#E9E9E9
| 377836 ||  || — || January 26, 2006 || Kitt Peak || Spacewatch || AGN || align=right | 1.3 km || 
|-id=837 bgcolor=#E9E9E9
| 377837 ||  || — || January 26, 2006 || Kitt Peak || Spacewatch || — || align=right | 2.6 km || 
|-id=838 bgcolor=#E9E9E9
| 377838 ||  || — || January 26, 2006 || Mount Lemmon || Mount Lemmon Survey || MRX || align=right | 1.2 km || 
|-id=839 bgcolor=#E9E9E9
| 377839 ||  || — || January 26, 2006 || Mount Lemmon || Mount Lemmon Survey || HNA || align=right | 3.7 km || 
|-id=840 bgcolor=#E9E9E9
| 377840 ||  || — || January 22, 2006 || Mount Lemmon || Mount Lemmon Survey || — || align=right | 3.9 km || 
|-id=841 bgcolor=#E9E9E9
| 377841 ||  || — || January 25, 2006 || Kitt Peak || Spacewatch || — || align=right | 2.3 km || 
|-id=842 bgcolor=#E9E9E9
| 377842 ||  || — || January 26, 2006 || Mount Lemmon || Mount Lemmon Survey || — || align=right | 1.2 km || 
|-id=843 bgcolor=#E9E9E9
| 377843 ||  || — || January 26, 2006 || Mount Lemmon || Mount Lemmon Survey || — || align=right | 1.0 km || 
|-id=844 bgcolor=#C2FFFF
| 377844 ||  || — || January 26, 2006 || Mount Lemmon || Mount Lemmon Survey || L5 || align=right | 8.5 km || 
|-id=845 bgcolor=#E9E9E9
| 377845 ||  || — || January 27, 2006 || Mount Lemmon || Mount Lemmon Survey || — || align=right | 1.5 km || 
|-id=846 bgcolor=#E9E9E9
| 377846 ||  || — || January 27, 2006 || Kitt Peak || Spacewatch || — || align=right | 2.8 km || 
|-id=847 bgcolor=#E9E9E9
| 377847 ||  || — || January 27, 2006 || Mount Lemmon || Mount Lemmon Survey || NEM || align=right | 1.9 km || 
|-id=848 bgcolor=#E9E9E9
| 377848 ||  || — || January 30, 2006 || Kitt Peak || Spacewatch || HOF || align=right | 2.8 km || 
|-id=849 bgcolor=#d6d6d6
| 377849 ||  || — || September 18, 2003 || Kitt Peak || Spacewatch || — || align=right | 2.7 km || 
|-id=850 bgcolor=#E9E9E9
| 377850 ||  || — || January 30, 2006 || Catalina || CSS || — || align=right | 3.4 km || 
|-id=851 bgcolor=#C2FFFF
| 377851 ||  || — || January 30, 2006 || Kitt Peak || Spacewatch || L5 || align=right | 7.6 km || 
|-id=852 bgcolor=#E9E9E9
| 377852 ||  || — || January 30, 2006 || Kitt Peak || Spacewatch || HOF || align=right | 2.4 km || 
|-id=853 bgcolor=#E9E9E9
| 377853 ||  || — || January 31, 2006 || Kitt Peak || Spacewatch || XIZ || align=right | 1.7 km || 
|-id=854 bgcolor=#E9E9E9
| 377854 ||  || — || January 31, 2006 || Kitt Peak || Spacewatch || — || align=right | 1.5 km || 
|-id=855 bgcolor=#E9E9E9
| 377855 ||  || — || January 31, 2006 || Kitt Peak || Spacewatch || — || align=right | 2.4 km || 
|-id=856 bgcolor=#E9E9E9
| 377856 ||  || — || January 26, 2006 || Anderson Mesa || LONEOS || — || align=right | 2.5 km || 
|-id=857 bgcolor=#E9E9E9
| 377857 ||  || — || January 30, 2006 || Kitt Peak || Spacewatch || — || align=right | 2.5 km || 
|-id=858 bgcolor=#E9E9E9
| 377858 ||  || — || January 30, 2006 || Kitt Peak || Spacewatch || — || align=right | 2.7 km || 
|-id=859 bgcolor=#E9E9E9
| 377859 ||  || — || January 23, 2006 || Kitt Peak || Spacewatch || — || align=right | 2.6 km || 
|-id=860 bgcolor=#E9E9E9
| 377860 ||  || — || January 31, 2006 || Kitt Peak || Spacewatch || — || align=right | 1.4 km || 
|-id=861 bgcolor=#E9E9E9
| 377861 ||  || — || January 31, 2006 || Kitt Peak || Spacewatch || — || align=right | 1.8 km || 
|-id=862 bgcolor=#E9E9E9
| 377862 ||  || — || January 31, 2006 || Kitt Peak || Spacewatch || — || align=right | 1.6 km || 
|-id=863 bgcolor=#E9E9E9
| 377863 ||  || — || January 31, 2006 || Mount Lemmon || Mount Lemmon Survey || — || align=right | 1.5 km || 
|-id=864 bgcolor=#E9E9E9
| 377864 ||  || — || January 31, 2006 || Kitt Peak || Spacewatch || AGN || align=right | 1.2 km || 
|-id=865 bgcolor=#E9E9E9
| 377865 ||  || — || January 31, 2006 || Kitt Peak || Spacewatch || — || align=right | 2.1 km || 
|-id=866 bgcolor=#E9E9E9
| 377866 ||  || — || January 28, 2006 || Mount Lemmon || Mount Lemmon Survey || — || align=right | 1.9 km || 
|-id=867 bgcolor=#C2FFFF
| 377867 ||  || — || January 31, 2006 || Kitt Peak || Spacewatch || L5 || align=right | 7.5 km || 
|-id=868 bgcolor=#E9E9E9
| 377868 ||  || — || February 1, 2006 || Catalina || CSS || — || align=right | 3.4 km || 
|-id=869 bgcolor=#E9E9E9
| 377869 ||  || — || February 1, 2006 || Catalina || CSS || — || align=right | 3.6 km || 
|-id=870 bgcolor=#E9E9E9
| 377870 ||  || — || February 2, 2006 || Kitt Peak || Spacewatch || — || align=right | 1.4 km || 
|-id=871 bgcolor=#E9E9E9
| 377871 ||  || — || February 2, 2006 || Mount Lemmon || Mount Lemmon Survey || — || align=right | 1.9 km || 
|-id=872 bgcolor=#E9E9E9
| 377872 ||  || — || February 3, 2006 || Kitt Peak || Spacewatch || — || align=right | 1.6 km || 
|-id=873 bgcolor=#E9E9E9
| 377873 ||  || — || January 5, 2006 || Mount Lemmon || Mount Lemmon Survey || — || align=right | 1.9 km || 
|-id=874 bgcolor=#E9E9E9
| 377874 ||  || — || February 1, 2006 || Kitt Peak || Spacewatch || — || align=right | 1.5 km || 
|-id=875 bgcolor=#E9E9E9
| 377875 ||  || — || February 21, 2006 || Catalina || CSS || — || align=right | 2.5 km || 
|-id=876 bgcolor=#E9E9E9
| 377876 ||  || — || February 20, 2006 || Kitt Peak || Spacewatch || WIT || align=right | 1.00 km || 
|-id=877 bgcolor=#E9E9E9
| 377877 ||  || — || February 20, 2006 || Kitt Peak || Spacewatch || HOF || align=right | 3.0 km || 
|-id=878 bgcolor=#E9E9E9
| 377878 ||  || — || February 20, 2006 || Kitt Peak || Spacewatch || — || align=right | 3.2 km || 
|-id=879 bgcolor=#E9E9E9
| 377879 ||  || — || October 9, 2004 || Kitt Peak || Spacewatch || — || align=right | 2.3 km || 
|-id=880 bgcolor=#E9E9E9
| 377880 ||  || — || February 20, 2006 || Kitt Peak || Spacewatch || AST || align=right | 1.7 km || 
|-id=881 bgcolor=#E9E9E9
| 377881 ||  || — || February 20, 2006 || Mount Lemmon || Mount Lemmon Survey || — || align=right | 2.5 km || 
|-id=882 bgcolor=#E9E9E9
| 377882 ||  || — || February 20, 2006 || Mount Lemmon || Mount Lemmon Survey || GEF || align=right | 1.5 km || 
|-id=883 bgcolor=#E9E9E9
| 377883 ||  || — || February 20, 2006 || Kitt Peak || Spacewatch || — || align=right | 1.4 km || 
|-id=884 bgcolor=#E9E9E9
| 377884 ||  || — || February 21, 2006 || Mount Lemmon || Mount Lemmon Survey || AGN || align=right | 1.5 km || 
|-id=885 bgcolor=#fefefe
| 377885 ||  || — || February 20, 2006 || Kitt Peak || Spacewatch || — || align=right data-sort-value="0.52" | 520 m || 
|-id=886 bgcolor=#E9E9E9
| 377886 ||  || — || February 20, 2006 || Kitt Peak || Spacewatch || — || align=right | 1.3 km || 
|-id=887 bgcolor=#E9E9E9
| 377887 ||  || — || February 21, 2006 || Mount Lemmon || Mount Lemmon Survey || AGN || align=right | 1.2 km || 
|-id=888 bgcolor=#d6d6d6
| 377888 ||  || — || February 24, 2006 || Mount Lemmon || Mount Lemmon Survey || 628 || align=right | 1.9 km || 
|-id=889 bgcolor=#E9E9E9
| 377889 ||  || — || February 22, 2006 || Palomar || NEAT || — || align=right | 1.7 km || 
|-id=890 bgcolor=#E9E9E9
| 377890 ||  || — || February 25, 2006 || Socorro || LINEAR || — || align=right | 3.1 km || 
|-id=891 bgcolor=#E9E9E9
| 377891 ||  || — || February 20, 2006 || Catalina || CSS || — || align=right | 1.8 km || 
|-id=892 bgcolor=#E9E9E9
| 377892 ||  || — || February 24, 2006 || Kitt Peak || Spacewatch || — || align=right | 1.4 km || 
|-id=893 bgcolor=#E9E9E9
| 377893 ||  || — || February 24, 2006 || Kitt Peak || Spacewatch || — || align=right | 2.3 km || 
|-id=894 bgcolor=#E9E9E9
| 377894 ||  || — || February 24, 2006 || Kitt Peak || Spacewatch || — || align=right | 2.8 km || 
|-id=895 bgcolor=#d6d6d6
| 377895 ||  || — || February 24, 2006 || Kitt Peak || Spacewatch || KOR || align=right | 1.4 km || 
|-id=896 bgcolor=#E9E9E9
| 377896 ||  || — || February 24, 2006 || Kitt Peak || Spacewatch || — || align=right | 2.3 km || 
|-id=897 bgcolor=#E9E9E9
| 377897 ||  || — || February 24, 2006 || Kitt Peak || Spacewatch || — || align=right | 2.1 km || 
|-id=898 bgcolor=#d6d6d6
| 377898 ||  || — || February 24, 2006 || Kitt Peak || Spacewatch || EUP || align=right | 3.4 km || 
|-id=899 bgcolor=#E9E9E9
| 377899 ||  || — || February 25, 2006 || Mount Lemmon || Mount Lemmon Survey || — || align=right | 2.4 km || 
|-id=900 bgcolor=#E9E9E9
| 377900 ||  || — || February 25, 2006 || Mount Lemmon || Mount Lemmon Survey || — || align=right | 2.1 km || 
|}

377901–378000 

|-bgcolor=#d6d6d6
| 377901 ||  || — || February 25, 2006 || Kitt Peak || Spacewatch || Tj (2.96) || align=right | 4.1 km || 
|-id=902 bgcolor=#E9E9E9
| 377902 ||  || — || February 27, 2006 || Kitt Peak || Spacewatch || — || align=right | 2.8 km || 
|-id=903 bgcolor=#C2FFFF
| 377903 ||  || — || February 28, 2006 || Mount Lemmon || Mount Lemmon Survey || L5 || align=right | 9.7 km || 
|-id=904 bgcolor=#E9E9E9
| 377904 ||  || — || February 22, 2006 || Catalina || CSS || — || align=right | 2.7 km || 
|-id=905 bgcolor=#E9E9E9
| 377905 ||  || — || February 25, 2006 || Kitt Peak || Spacewatch || AGN || align=right | 1.3 km || 
|-id=906 bgcolor=#E9E9E9
| 377906 ||  || — || February 27, 2006 || Mount Lemmon || Mount Lemmon Survey || WIT || align=right | 1.2 km || 
|-id=907 bgcolor=#E9E9E9
| 377907 ||  || — || February 27, 2006 || Kitt Peak || Spacewatch || NEM || align=right | 2.6 km || 
|-id=908 bgcolor=#E9E9E9
| 377908 ||  || — || February 27, 2006 || Kitt Peak || Spacewatch || AGN || align=right | 1.3 km || 
|-id=909 bgcolor=#E9E9E9
| 377909 ||  || — || February 24, 2006 || Catalina || CSS || — || align=right | 1.4 km || 
|-id=910 bgcolor=#E9E9E9
| 377910 ||  || — || February 25, 2006 || Mount Lemmon || Mount Lemmon Survey || — || align=right | 1.9 km || 
|-id=911 bgcolor=#E9E9E9
| 377911 ||  || — || February 27, 2006 || Mount Lemmon || Mount Lemmon Survey || AGN || align=right | 1.1 km || 
|-id=912 bgcolor=#E9E9E9
| 377912 ||  || — || February 23, 2006 || Anderson Mesa || LONEOS || — || align=right | 1.5 km || 
|-id=913 bgcolor=#E9E9E9
| 377913 ||  || — || March 2, 2006 || Kitt Peak || Spacewatch || HEN || align=right | 1.3 km || 
|-id=914 bgcolor=#E9E9E9
| 377914 ||  || — || March 2, 2006 || Kitt Peak || Spacewatch || — || align=right | 2.7 km || 
|-id=915 bgcolor=#E9E9E9
| 377915 ||  || — || March 2, 2006 || Kitt Peak || Spacewatch || AGN || align=right | 1.3 km || 
|-id=916 bgcolor=#E9E9E9
| 377916 ||  || — || February 25, 2006 || Kitt Peak || Spacewatch || AGN || align=right | 1.3 km || 
|-id=917 bgcolor=#E9E9E9
| 377917 ||  || — || March 2, 2006 || Kitt Peak || Spacewatch || — || align=right | 2.2 km || 
|-id=918 bgcolor=#E9E9E9
| 377918 ||  || — || March 3, 2006 || Kitt Peak || Spacewatch || HEN || align=right | 1.1 km || 
|-id=919 bgcolor=#E9E9E9
| 377919 ||  || — || March 3, 2006 || Mount Lemmon || Mount Lemmon Survey || HOF || align=right | 3.4 km || 
|-id=920 bgcolor=#d6d6d6
| 377920 ||  || — || March 4, 2006 || Kitt Peak || Spacewatch || LAU || align=right | 1.1 km || 
|-id=921 bgcolor=#d6d6d6
| 377921 ||  || — || March 4, 2006 || Kitt Peak || Spacewatch || — || align=right | 3.2 km || 
|-id=922 bgcolor=#E9E9E9
| 377922 ||  || — || March 1, 2006 || Great Shefford || Great Shefford Obs. || — || align=right | 1.7 km || 
|-id=923 bgcolor=#d6d6d6
| 377923 ||  || — || March 2, 2006 || Kitt Peak || Spacewatch || ALA || align=right | 2.8 km || 
|-id=924 bgcolor=#E9E9E9
| 377924 ||  || — || March 2, 2006 || Mount Lemmon || Mount Lemmon Survey || — || align=right | 2.5 km || 
|-id=925 bgcolor=#E9E9E9
| 377925 ||  || — || March 23, 2006 || Kitt Peak || Spacewatch || — || align=right | 2.8 km || 
|-id=926 bgcolor=#d6d6d6
| 377926 ||  || — || March 23, 2006 || Kitt Peak || Spacewatch || — || align=right | 3.4 km || 
|-id=927 bgcolor=#d6d6d6
| 377927 ||  || — || March 23, 2006 || Catalina || CSS || — || align=right | 5.6 km || 
|-id=928 bgcolor=#d6d6d6
| 377928 ||  || — || April 2, 2006 || Kitt Peak || Spacewatch || — || align=right | 3.0 km || 
|-id=929 bgcolor=#E9E9E9
| 377929 ||  || — || April 2, 2006 || Kitt Peak || Spacewatch || HOF || align=right | 3.4 km || 
|-id=930 bgcolor=#d6d6d6
| 377930 ||  || — || March 23, 2006 || Kitt Peak || Spacewatch || — || align=right | 2.9 km || 
|-id=931 bgcolor=#d6d6d6
| 377931 ||  || — || April 2, 2006 || Kitt Peak || Spacewatch || — || align=right | 2.9 km || 
|-id=932 bgcolor=#E9E9E9
| 377932 ||  || — || April 2, 2006 || Kitt Peak || Spacewatch || — || align=right | 2.5 km || 
|-id=933 bgcolor=#d6d6d6
| 377933 ||  || — || March 23, 2006 || Catalina || CSS || — || align=right | 4.0 km || 
|-id=934 bgcolor=#d6d6d6
| 377934 ||  || — || April 7, 2006 || Kitt Peak || Spacewatch || — || align=right | 2.9 km || 
|-id=935 bgcolor=#E9E9E9
| 377935 ||  || — || April 20, 2006 || Kitt Peak || Spacewatch || MIS || align=right | 2.2 km || 
|-id=936 bgcolor=#d6d6d6
| 377936 ||  || — || April 20, 2006 || Lulin Observatory || Q.-z. Ye || — || align=right | 3.5 km || 
|-id=937 bgcolor=#d6d6d6
| 377937 ||  || — || April 21, 2006 || Kitt Peak || Spacewatch || Tj (2.94) || align=right | 5.3 km || 
|-id=938 bgcolor=#E9E9E9
| 377938 ||  || — || April 30, 2006 || Marly || P. Kocher || — || align=right | 3.3 km || 
|-id=939 bgcolor=#FA8072
| 377939 ||  || — || April 21, 2006 || Palomar || NEAT || — || align=right data-sort-value="0.59" | 590 m || 
|-id=940 bgcolor=#d6d6d6
| 377940 ||  || — || April 24, 2006 || Anderson Mesa || LONEOS || — || align=right | 3.5 km || 
|-id=941 bgcolor=#d6d6d6
| 377941 ||  || — || April 24, 2006 || Kitt Peak || Spacewatch || — || align=right | 3.3 km || 
|-id=942 bgcolor=#d6d6d6
| 377942 ||  || — || April 25, 2006 || Kitt Peak || Spacewatch || — || align=right | 2.6 km || 
|-id=943 bgcolor=#d6d6d6
| 377943 ||  || — || April 26, 2006 || Kitt Peak || Spacewatch || URS || align=right | 3.4 km || 
|-id=944 bgcolor=#E9E9E9
| 377944 ||  || — || April 29, 2006 || Kitt Peak || Spacewatch || — || align=right | 2.5 km || 
|-id=945 bgcolor=#d6d6d6
| 377945 ||  || — || April 19, 2006 || Catalina || CSS || Tj (2.93) || align=right | 3.4 km || 
|-id=946 bgcolor=#d6d6d6
| 377946 ||  || — || April 29, 2006 || Kitt Peak || Spacewatch || EOS || align=right | 2.1 km || 
|-id=947 bgcolor=#E9E9E9
| 377947 ||  || — || April 7, 2006 || Kitt Peak || Spacewatch || DOR || align=right | 2.8 km || 
|-id=948 bgcolor=#d6d6d6
| 377948 ||  || — || April 30, 2006 || Kitt Peak || Spacewatch || EOS || align=right | 1.8 km || 
|-id=949 bgcolor=#FA8072
| 377949 ||  || — || April 25, 2006 || Kitt Peak || Spacewatch || — || align=right data-sort-value="0.78" | 780 m || 
|-id=950 bgcolor=#d6d6d6
| 377950 ||  || — || May 1, 2006 || Kitt Peak || Spacewatch || — || align=right | 3.0 km || 
|-id=951 bgcolor=#E9E9E9
| 377951 ||  || — || May 2, 2006 || Mount Lemmon || Mount Lemmon Survey || — || align=right | 2.5 km || 
|-id=952 bgcolor=#d6d6d6
| 377952 ||  || — || May 2, 2006 || Kitt Peak || Spacewatch || — || align=right | 2.9 km || 
|-id=953 bgcolor=#d6d6d6
| 377953 ||  || — || May 2, 2006 || Mount Lemmon || Mount Lemmon Survey || EOS || align=right | 1.8 km || 
|-id=954 bgcolor=#d6d6d6
| 377954 ||  || — || May 2, 2006 || Kitt Peak || Spacewatch || EOS || align=right | 2.4 km || 
|-id=955 bgcolor=#d6d6d6
| 377955 ||  || — || May 2, 2006 || Kitt Peak || Spacewatch || — || align=right | 3.1 km || 
|-id=956 bgcolor=#d6d6d6
| 377956 ||  || — || May 3, 2006 || Kitt Peak || Spacewatch || — || align=right | 3.0 km || 
|-id=957 bgcolor=#d6d6d6
| 377957 ||  || — || May 2, 2006 || Kitt Peak || Spacewatch || — || align=right | 2.9 km || 
|-id=958 bgcolor=#d6d6d6
| 377958 ||  || — || May 6, 2006 || Kitt Peak || Spacewatch || — || align=right | 3.4 km || 
|-id=959 bgcolor=#E9E9E9
| 377959 ||  || — || May 1, 2006 || Mauna Kea || P. A. Wiegert || DOR || align=right | 2.8 km || 
|-id=960 bgcolor=#E9E9E9
| 377960 ||  || — || May 1, 2006 || Kitt Peak || M. W. Buie || WIT || align=right | 1.4 km || 
|-id=961 bgcolor=#E9E9E9
| 377961 ||  || — || May 1, 2006 || Kitt Peak || M. W. Buie || HOF || align=right | 2.4 km || 
|-id=962 bgcolor=#d6d6d6
| 377962 ||  || — || May 1, 2006 || Kitt Peak || Spacewatch || — || align=right | 2.4 km || 
|-id=963 bgcolor=#d6d6d6
| 377963 ||  || — || May 17, 2006 || Palomar || NEAT || — || align=right | 3.9 km || 
|-id=964 bgcolor=#d6d6d6
| 377964 ||  || — || May 19, 2006 || Anderson Mesa || LONEOS || EUP || align=right | 5.4 km || 
|-id=965 bgcolor=#d6d6d6
| 377965 ||  || — || May 20, 2006 || Kitt Peak || Spacewatch || — || align=right | 3.9 km || 
|-id=966 bgcolor=#d6d6d6
| 377966 ||  || — || May 20, 2006 || Kitt Peak || Spacewatch || — || align=right | 3.4 km || 
|-id=967 bgcolor=#d6d6d6
| 377967 ||  || — || May 21, 2006 || Kitt Peak || Spacewatch || — || align=right | 2.9 km || 
|-id=968 bgcolor=#fefefe
| 377968 ||  || — || May 21, 2006 || Siding Spring || SSS || — || align=right data-sort-value="0.72" | 720 m || 
|-id=969 bgcolor=#d6d6d6
| 377969 ||  || — || May 21, 2006 || Kitt Peak || Spacewatch || — || align=right | 2.4 km || 
|-id=970 bgcolor=#d6d6d6
| 377970 ||  || — || May 29, 2006 || Kitt Peak || Spacewatch || — || align=right | 2.8 km || 
|-id=971 bgcolor=#FA8072
| 377971 ||  || — || June 11, 2006 || Palomar || NEAT || — || align=right data-sort-value="0.67" | 670 m || 
|-id=972 bgcolor=#FFC2E0
| 377972 ||  || — || June 20, 2006 || Palomar || NEAT || AMO || align=right data-sort-value="0.49" | 490 m || 
|-id=973 bgcolor=#FA8072
| 377973 ||  || — || July 2, 2006 || Pla D'Arguines || Pla D'Arguines Obs. || — || align=right data-sort-value="0.87" | 870 m || 
|-id=974 bgcolor=#FA8072
| 377974 ||  || — || June 22, 2006 || Kitt Peak || Spacewatch || — || align=right data-sort-value="0.84" | 840 m || 
|-id=975 bgcolor=#fefefe
| 377975 ||  || — || July 21, 2006 || Mount Lemmon || Mount Lemmon Survey || V || align=right data-sort-value="0.67" | 670 m || 
|-id=976 bgcolor=#fefefe
| 377976 ||  || — || June 20, 2006 || Mount Lemmon || Mount Lemmon Survey || — || align=right data-sort-value="0.71" | 710 m || 
|-id=977 bgcolor=#fefefe
| 377977 ||  || — || July 25, 2006 || Mount Lemmon || Mount Lemmon Survey || — || align=right data-sort-value="0.85" | 850 m || 
|-id=978 bgcolor=#fefefe
| 377978 ||  || — || August 15, 2006 || Palomar || NEAT || — || align=right data-sort-value="0.74" | 740 m || 
|-id=979 bgcolor=#fefefe
| 377979 ||  || — || August 19, 2006 || Kitt Peak || Spacewatch || — || align=right data-sort-value="0.64" | 640 m || 
|-id=980 bgcolor=#fefefe
| 377980 ||  || — || August 19, 2006 || Anderson Mesa || LONEOS || FLO || align=right data-sort-value="0.67" | 670 m || 
|-id=981 bgcolor=#fefefe
| 377981 ||  || — || July 21, 2006 || Catalina || CSS || FLO || align=right data-sort-value="0.67" | 670 m || 
|-id=982 bgcolor=#fefefe
| 377982 ||  || — || August 23, 2006 || Palomar || NEAT || — || align=right data-sort-value="0.77" | 770 m || 
|-id=983 bgcolor=#fefefe
| 377983 ||  || — || August 17, 2006 || Palomar || NEAT || FLO || align=right data-sort-value="0.58" | 580 m || 
|-id=984 bgcolor=#fefefe
| 377984 ||  || — || August 29, 2006 || Catalina || CSS || FLO || align=right data-sort-value="0.62" | 620 m || 
|-id=985 bgcolor=#fefefe
| 377985 ||  || — || August 29, 2006 || Anderson Mesa || LONEOS || — || align=right | 1.3 km || 
|-id=986 bgcolor=#fefefe
| 377986 ||  || — || November 24, 2003 || Kitt Peak || Spacewatch || — || align=right data-sort-value="0.65" | 650 m || 
|-id=987 bgcolor=#fefefe
| 377987 ||  || — || August 19, 2006 || Kitt Peak || Spacewatch || — || align=right data-sort-value="0.73" | 730 m || 
|-id=988 bgcolor=#fefefe
| 377988 ||  || — || August 19, 2006 || Kitt Peak || Spacewatch || NYS || align=right data-sort-value="0.47" | 470 m || 
|-id=989 bgcolor=#E9E9E9
| 377989 ||  || — || August 30, 2006 || Anderson Mesa || LONEOS || — || align=right | 2.4 km || 
|-id=990 bgcolor=#fefefe
| 377990 ||  || — || September 14, 2006 || Palomar || NEAT || FLO || align=right data-sort-value="0.81" | 810 m || 
|-id=991 bgcolor=#fefefe
| 377991 ||  || — || September 15, 2006 || Kitt Peak || Spacewatch || — || align=right data-sort-value="0.54" | 540 m || 
|-id=992 bgcolor=#fefefe
| 377992 ||  || — || September 14, 2006 || Catalina || CSS || — || align=right data-sort-value="0.77" | 770 m || 
|-id=993 bgcolor=#fefefe
| 377993 ||  || — || September 14, 2006 || Catalina || CSS || FLOslow? || align=right data-sort-value="0.76" | 760 m || 
|-id=994 bgcolor=#fefefe
| 377994 ||  || — || September 12, 2006 || Catalina || CSS || FLO || align=right data-sort-value="0.64" | 640 m || 
|-id=995 bgcolor=#fefefe
| 377995 ||  || — || September 14, 2006 || Kitt Peak || Spacewatch || — || align=right data-sort-value="0.70" | 700 m || 
|-id=996 bgcolor=#d6d6d6
| 377996 ||  || — || September 14, 2006 || Kitt Peak || Spacewatch || SYL7:4 || align=right | 4.1 km || 
|-id=997 bgcolor=#fefefe
| 377997 ||  || — || July 18, 2006 || Mount Lemmon || Mount Lemmon Survey || — || align=right data-sort-value="0.69" | 690 m || 
|-id=998 bgcolor=#FA8072
| 377998 ||  || — || September 15, 2006 || Kitt Peak || Spacewatch || PHO || align=right data-sort-value="0.85" | 850 m || 
|-id=999 bgcolor=#fefefe
| 377999 ||  || — || September 15, 2006 || Kitt Peak || Spacewatch || — || align=right data-sort-value="0.60" | 600 m || 
|-id=000 bgcolor=#fefefe
| 378000 ||  || — || September 15, 2006 || Kitt Peak || Spacewatch || V || align=right data-sort-value="0.73" | 730 m || 
|}

References

External links 
 Discovery Circumstances: Numbered Minor Planets (375001)–(380000) (IAU Minor Planet Center)

0377